= Non-associative algebra =

Algebra over a field where binary multiplication is not necessarily associative

A non-associative algebra (or distributive algebra) is an algebra over a field where the binary multiplication operation is not assumed to be associative. That is, an algebraic structure A is a non-associative algebra over a field K if it is a vector space over K and is equipped with a K-bilinear binary multiplication operation A × A → A which may or may not be associative. Examples include Lie algebras, Jordan algebras, the octonions, and three-dimensional Euclidean space equipped with the cross product operation. Since it is not assumed that the multiplication is associative, using parentheses to indicate the order of multiplications is necessary. For example, the expressions (ab)(cd), (a(bc))d and a(b(cd)) may all yield different answers.

While this use of non-associative means that associativity is not assumed, it does not mean that associativity is disallowed. In other words, "non-associative" means "not necessarily associative", just as "noncommutative" means "not necessarily commutative" for noncommutative rings.

An algebra is unital or unitary if it has an identity element e with ex = x = xe for all x in the algebra. For example, the octonions are unital, but Lie algebras never are.

The nonassociative algebra structure of A may be studied by associating it with other associative algebras which are subalgebras of the full algebra of K-endomorphisms of A as a K-vector space. Two such are the derivation algebra and the (associative) enveloping algebra, the latter being in a sense "the smallest associative algebra containing A".

More generally, some authors consider the concept of a non-associative algebra over a commutative ring R: An R-module equipped with an R-bilinear binary multiplication operation. If a structure obeys all of the ring axioms apart from associativity (for example, any R-algebra), then it is naturally a $\mathbb{Z}$-algebra, so some authors refer to non-associative $\mathbb{Z}$-algebras as non-associative rings.

== Algebras satisfying identities ==
Ring-like structures with two binary operations and no other restrictions are a broad class, one which is too general to study. For this reason, the best-known kinds of non-associative algebras satisfy identities, or properties, which simplify multiplication somewhat. These include the following ones.

=== Usual properties ===
Let x, y and z denote arbitrary elements of the algebra A over the field K. Let powers to positive (non-zero) integer be recursively defined by x^{1} ≝ x and either x^{n+1} ≝ x^{n}x (right powers) or x^{n+1} ≝ xx^{n} (left powers) depending on authors.

- Unital: there exist an element e so that ex = x = xe; in that case we can define x^{0} ≝ e.
- Associative: (xy)z = x(yz).
- Commutative: xy = yx.
- Anticommutative: xy = −yx.
- Jacobi identity: (xy)z + (yz)x + (zx)y = 0 or x(yz) + y(zx) + z(xy) = 0 depending on authors, but these are equivalent for anticommutative algebras, and Lie algebras are anticommutative algebras obeying the Jacobi identity.
- Jordan identity: (x^{2}y)x = x^{2}(yx) or (xy)x^{2} = x(yx^{2}) depending on authors, but these are equivalent for commutative algebras, and Jordan algebras are commutative algebras obeying the Jordan identity.
- Alternative: (xx)y = x(xy) (left alternative) and (yx)x = y(xx) (right alternative).
- Flexible: (xy)x = x(yx).
- nth power associative with n ≥ 2: x^{n−k}x^{k} = x^{n} for all integers k so that 0 < k < n.
  - Third power associative: x^{2}x = xx^{2}.
  - Fourth power associative: x^{3}x = x^{2}x^{2} = xx^{3} (compare with fourth power commutative below).
- Power associative: the subalgebra generated by any element is associative, i.e., nth power associative for all n ≥ 2.
- nth power commutative with n ≥ 2: x^{n−k}x^{k} = x^{k}x^{n−k} for all integers k so that 0 < k < n.
  - Third power commutative: x^{2}x = xx^{2}.
  - Fourth power commutative: x^{3}x = xx^{3} (compare with fourth power associative above).
- Power commutative: the subalgebra generated by any element is commutative, i.e., nth power commutative for all n ≥ 2.
- Nilpotent of index n ≥ 2: the product of any n elements, in any association, vanishes, but not for some n−1 elements: x_{1}x_{2}…x_{n} = 0 and there exist n−1 elements so that y_{1}y_{2}…y_{n−1} ≠ 0 for a specific association.
- Nil of index n ≥ 2: power associative and x^{n} = 0 and there exist an element y so that y^{n−1} ≠ 0.

=== Relations between properties ===
For K of any characteristic:

- Associative implies alternative.
- Any two out of the three properties left alternative, right alternative, and flexible, imply the third one.
  - Thus, alternative implies flexible.
- Alternative implies Jordan identity. (Note: It follows from the Artin's theorem.)
- Commutative implies flexible.
- Anticommutative implies flexible.
- Alternative implies power associative.
- Flexible implies third power associative.
- Second power associative and second power commutative are always true.
- Third power associative and third power commutative are equivalent.
- nth power associative implies nth power commutative.
- Nil of index 2 implies anticommutative.
- Nil of index 2 implies Jordan identity.
- Nilpotent of index 3 implies Jacobi identity.
- Nilpotent of index n implies nil of index N with 2 ≤ N ≤ n.
- Unital and nil of index n are incompatible.

If K ≠ GF(2) or dim(A) ≤ 3:

- Jordan identity and commutative together imply power associative.

If char(K) ≠ 2:

- Right alternative implies power associative.
  - Similarly, left alternative implies power associative.
- Unital and Jordan identity together imply flexible.
- Jordan identity and flexible together imply power associative.
- Commutative and anticommutative together imply nilpotent of index 2.
- Anticommutative implies nil of index 2.
- Unital and anticommutative are incompatible.

If char(K) ≠ 3:

- Unital and Jacobi identity are incompatible.

If char(K) ∉ {2,3,5}:

- Commutative and x^{4} = x^{2}x^{2} (one of the two identities defining fourth power associative) together imply power associative.

If char(K) = 0:

- Third power associative and x^{4} = x^{2}x^{2} (one of the two identities defining fourth power associative) together imply power associative.

If char(K) = 2:

- Commutative and anticommutative are equivalent.

=== Associator ===
The associator on A is the K-multilinear map $[\cdot,\cdot,\cdot] : A \times A \times A \to A$ given by

[x,y,z] = (xy)z − x(yz).

It measures the degree of nonassociativity of $A$, and can be used to conveniently express some possible identities satisfied by A.

Let x, y and z denote arbitrary elements of the algebra.

- Associative: [x,y,z] = 0.
- Alternative: [x,x,y] = 0 (left alternative) and [y,x,x] = 0 (right alternative).
  - It implies that permuting any two terms changes the sign: [x,y,z] = −[x,z,y] = −[z,y,x] = −[y,x,z]; the converse holds only if char(K) ≠ 2.
- Flexible: [x,y,x] = 0.
  - It implies that permuting the extremal terms changes the sign: [x,y,z] = −[z,y,x]; the converse holds only if char(K) ≠ 2.
- Jordan identity: [x^{2},y,x] = 0 or [x,y,x^{2}] = 0 depending on authors.
- Third power associative: [x,x,x] = 0.

The nucleus is the set of elements that associate with all others: that is, the n in A such that

[n,A,A] = [A,n,A] = [A,A,n] = {0}.

The nucleus is an associative subring of A.

=== Center ===
The center of A is the set of elements that commute and associate with everything in A, that is the intersection of
$$C(A) = \{ n \in A \ | \ nr=rn \, \forall r \in A \, \}$$
with the nucleus. It turns out that for elements of C(A) it is enough that two of the sets $([n,A,A], [A,n,A] , [A,A,n])$ are $\{0\}$ for the third to also be the zero set.

== Examples ==
- Euclidean space R^{3} with multiplication given by the vector cross product is an example of an algebra which is anticommutative and not associative. The cross product also satisfies the Jacobi identity.
- Lie algebras are algebras satisfying anticommutativity and the Jacobi identity.
- Algebras of vector fields on a differentiable manifold (if K is R or the complex numbers C) or an algebraic variety (for general K);
- Jordan algebras are algebras which satisfy the commutative law and the Jordan identity.
- Every associative algebra gives rise to a Lie algebra by using the commutator as Lie bracket. In fact every Lie algebra can either be constructed this way, or is a subalgebra of a Lie algebra so constructed.
- Every associative algebra over a field of characteristic other than 2 gives rise to a Jordan algebra by defining a new multiplication x*y = (xy+yx)/2. In contrast to the Lie algebra case, not every Jordan algebra can be constructed this way. Those that can are called special.
- Alternative algebras are algebras satisfying the alternative property. The most important examples of alternative algebras are the octonions (an algebra over the reals), and generalizations of the octonions over other fields, called octonion algebras, such as the bioctonions. All associative algebras are alternative. Up to isomorphism, the only finite-dimensional real alternative, division algebras (see below) are the reals, complexes, quaternions and octonions.
- Power-associative algebras, are those algebras satisfying the power-associative identity. Examples include all associative algebras, all alternative algebras, Jordan algebras over a field other than GF(2) (see previous section), and the sedenions.

More classes of algebras:

- Graded algebras. These include most of the algebras of interest to multilinear algebra, such as the tensor algebra, symmetric algebra, and exterior algebra over a given vector space. Graded algebras can be generalized to filtered algebras.
- Division algebras, in which multiplicative inverses exist. The finite-dimensional alternative division algebras over the field of real numbers have been classified. They are the real numbers (dimension 1), the complex numbers (dimension 2), the quaternions (dimension 4), and the octonions (dimension 8). The quaternions and octonions are not commutative. Of these algebras, all are associative except for the octonions.
- Quadratic algebras, which require that xx = re + sx, for some elements r and s in the ground field, and e a unit for the algebra. Examples include all finite-dimensional alternative algebras, and the algebra of real 2-by-2 matrices. Up to isomorphism the only alternative, quadratic real algebras without divisors of zero are the reals, complexes, quaternions, and octonions.
- The Cayley–Dickson algebras (where K is R), which begin with:
  - the complex numbers C (a commutative and associative algebra);
  - the quaternions H (an associative algebra);
  - the octonions O (an alternative algebra);
  - the sedenions S;
  - the trigintaduonions T and the infinite sequence of Cayley-Dickson algebras (power-associative algebras).
- Hypercomplex algebras are all finite-dimensional unital R-algebras, they thus include Cayley-Dickson algebras and many more.
- The Poisson algebras are considered in geometric quantization. They carry two multiplications, turning them into commutative algebras and Lie algebras in different ways.
- Genetic algebras are non-associative algebras used in mathematical genetics.
- Triple systems

== Properties ==
There are several properties that may be familiar from ring theory, or from associative algebras, which are not always true for non-associative algebras. Unlike the associative case, elements with a (two-sided) multiplicative inverse might also be a zero divisor. For example, all non-zero elements of the sedenions have a two-sided inverse, but some of them are also zero divisors.

== Free non-associative algebra ==
The free non-associative algebra on a set X over a field K is defined as the algebra with basis consisting of all non-associative monomials, finite formal products of elements of X retaining parentheses. The product of monomials u, v is just (u)(v). The algebra is unital if one takes the empty product as a monomial.

Kurosh proved that every subalgebra of a free non-associative algebra is free.

== Associated algebras ==
An algebra A over a field K is in particular a K-vector space and so one can consider the associative algebra End_{K}(A) of K-linear vector space endomorphism of A. We can associate to the algebra structure on A two subalgebras of End_{K}(A), the derivation algebra and the (associative) enveloping algebra.

=== Derivation algebra ===
A derivation on A is a map D with the property

$$D(x \cdot y) = D(x) \cdot y + x \cdot D(y) \ .$$

The derivations on A form a subspace Der_{K}(A) in End_{K}(A). The commutator of two derivations is again a derivation, so that the Lie bracket gives Der_{K}(A) a structure of Lie algebra.

=== Enveloping algebra ===
There are linear maps L and R attached to each element a of an algebra A:

$$L(a) : x \mapsto ax ; \ \  R(a) : x \mapsto xa \ .$$

Here each element $L(a),R(a)$ is regarded as an element of End_{K}(A). The associative enveloping algebra or multiplication algebra of A is the sub-associative algebra of End_{K}(A) generated by the left and right linear maps $L(a),R(a)$. The centroid of A is the centraliser of the enveloping algebra in the endomorphism algebra End_{K}(A). An algebra is central if its centroid consists of the K-scalar multiples of the identity.

Some of the possible identities satisfied by non-associative algebras may be conveniently expressed in terms of the linear maps:

- Commutative: each L(a) is equal to the corresponding R(a);
- Associative: any L commutes with any R;
- Flexible: every L(a) commutes with the corresponding R(a);
- Jordan: every L(a) commutes with R(a^{2});
- Alternative: every L(a)^{2} = L(a^{2}) and similarly for the right.

The quadratic representation Q is defined by
$$Q(a) : x \mapsto 2a \cdot (a \cdot x) - (a \cdot a) \cdot x \$$
or equivalently,

$$Q(a) = 2 L^2(a) - L(a^2) \ .$$

The article on universal enveloping algebras describes the canonical construction of enveloping algebras, as well as the PBW-type theorems for them. For Lie algebras, such enveloping algebras have a universal property, which does not hold, in general, for non-associative algebras. The best-known example is, perhaps the Albert algebra, an exceptional Jordan algebra that is not enveloped by the canonical construction of the enveloping algebra for Jordan algebras.

== See also ==
- List of algebras
- Commutative non-associative magmas, which give rise to non-associative algebras
