= Nilpotent algebra =

In mathematics, specifically in ring theory, a nilpotent algebra over a commutative ring is an algebra over a commutative ring, in which for some positive integer n every product containing at least n elements of the algebra is zero. The concept of a nilpotent Lie algebra has a different definition, which depends upon the Lie bracket. (There is no Lie bracket for many algebras over commutative rings; a Lie algebra involves its Lie bracket, whereas, there is no Lie bracket defined in the general case of an algebra over a commutative ring.) Another possible source of confusion in terminology is the quantum nilpotent algebra, a concept related to quantum groups and Hopf algebras.

== Formal definition ==
An associative algebra $A$ over a commutative ring $R$ is defined to be a nilpotent algebra if and only if there exists some positive integer $n$ such that $0=y_1\ y_2\ \cdots\ y_n$ for all $y_1, \ y_2, \ \ldots,\ y_n$ in the algebra $A$. The smallest such $n$ is called the index of the algebra $A$. In the case of a non-associative algebra, the definition is that every different multiplicative association of the $n$ elements is zero.

== Nil algebra ==
A power associative algebra in which every element of the algebra is nilpotent is called a nil algebra.

Nilpotent algebras are trivially nil, whereas nil algebras may not be nilpotent, as each element being nilpotent does not force products of distinct elements to vanish.

== See also ==
- Algebraic structure (a much more general term)
- nil-Coxeter algebra
- Lie algebra
- Example of a non-associative algebra
