= List of problems in loop theory and quasigroup theory =

In mathematics, especially abstract algebra, loop theory and quasigroup theory are active research areas with many open problems. As in other areas of mathematics, such problems are often made public at professional conferences and meetings. Many of the problems posed here first appeared in the Loops (Prague) conferences and the Mile High (Denver) conferences.

== Open problems (Moufang loops) ==
=== Abelian by cyclic groups resulting in Moufang loops ===
Let L be a Moufang loop with normal abelian subgroup (associative subloop) M of odd order such that L/M is a cyclic group of order bigger than 3. (i) Is L a group? (ii) If the orders of M and L/M are relatively prime, is L a group?

- Proposed: by Michael Kinyon, based on (Chein and Rajah, 2000)
- Comments: The assumption that L/M has order bigger than 3 is important, as there is a (commutative) Moufang loop L of order 81 with normal commutative subgroup of order 27.

=== Embedding CMLs of period 3 into alternative algebras ===
Conjecture: Any finite commutative Moufang loop of period 3 can be embedded into a commutative alternative algebra.

- Proposed: by Alexander Grishkov at Loops '03, Prague 2003
- Comment: Grishkov and Shestakov, 2011 proved that for n<7, the n-generated free commutative Moufang loop of exponent 3 can be embedded into a commutative alternative algebra.

=== Frattini subloop for Moufang loops ===
Conjecture: Let L be a finite Moufang loop and Φ(L) the intersection of all maximal subloops of L. Then Φ(L) is a normal nilpotent subloop of L.

- Proposed: by Alexander Grishkov at Loops '11, Třešť 2011

=== Minimal presentations for loops M(G,2) ===
For a group $G$, define $M(G,2)$ on $G$ x $C_2$ by $(g,0)(h,0)=(gh,0)$, $(g,0)(h,1)=(hg,1)$, $(g,1)(h,0)=(gh^{-1},1)$, $(g,1)(h,1)=(h^{-1}g,0)$. Find a minimal presentation for the Moufang loop $M(G,2)$ with respect to a presentation for $G$.

- Proposed: by Petr Vojtěchovský at Loops '03, Prague 2003
- Comments: Chein showed in (Chein, 1974) that $M(G,2)$ is a Moufang loop that is nonassociative if and only if $G$ is nonabelian. Vojtěchovský (Vojtěchovský, 2003) found a minimal presentation for $M(G,2)$ when $G$ is a 2-generated group.

=== Presentations for finite simple Moufang loops ===
Find presentations for all nonassociative finite simple Moufang loops in the variety of Moufang loops.

- Proposed: by Petr Vojtěchovský at Loops '03, Prague 2003
- Comments: It is shown in (Vojtěchovský, 2003) that every nonassociative finite simple Moufang loop is generated by 3 elements, with explicit formulas for the generators.

=== The restricted Burnside problem for Moufang loops ===
Conjecture: Let M be a finite Moufang loop of exponent n with m generators. Then there exists a function f(n,m) such that |M| < f(n,m).

- Proposed: by Alexander Grishkov at Loops '11, Třešť 2011
- Comments: In the case when n is a prime different from 3 the conjecture was proved by Grishkov. If p = 3 and M is commutative, it was proved by Bruck. The general case for p = 3 was proved by G. Nagy. The case n = p^{m} holds by the Grishkov–Sabinina–Zelmanov Theorem.

=== The Sanov and M. Hall theorems for Moufang loops ===
Conjecture: Let L be a finitely generated Moufang loop of exponent 4 or 6. Then L is finite.

- Proposed: by Alexander Grishkov at Loops '11, Třešť 2011

=== Torsion in free Moufang loops ===
Let MF_{n} be the free Moufang loop with n generators.

Conjecture: MF_{3} is torsion free but MF_{n} with n > 4 is not.

- Proposed: by Alexander Grishkov at Loops '03, Prague 2003

== Open problems (Bol loops) ==
=== Nilpotency degree of the left multiplication group of a left Bol loop ===
For a left Bol loop Q, find some relation between the nilpotency degree of the left multiplication group of Q and the structure of Q.

- Proposed: at Milehigh conference on quasigroups, loops, and nonassociative systems, Denver 2005

=== Are two Bol loops with similar multiplication tables isomorphic? ===
Let $(Q,*)$, $(Q,+)$ be two quasigroups defined on the same underlying set $Q$. The distance $d(*,+)$ is the number of pairs $(a,b)$ in $Q\times Q$ such that $a*b\ne a+b$. Call a class of finite quasigroups quadratic if there is a positive real number $\alpha$ such that any two quasigroups $(Q,*)$, $(Q,+)$ of order $n$ from the class satisfying $d(*,+) < \alpha\,n^2$ are isomorphic. Are Moufang loops quadratic? Are Bol loops quadratic?

- Proposed: by Aleš Drápal at Loops '99, Prague 1999
- Comments: Drápal proved in (Drápal, 1992) that groups are quadratic with $\alpha=1/9$, and in (Drápal, 2000) that 2-groups are quadratic with $\alpha=1/4$.

=== Campbell–Hausdorff series for analytic Bol loops ===
Determine the Campbell–Hausdorff series for analytic Bol loops.

- Proposed: by M. A. Akivis and V. V. Goldberg at Loops '99, Prague 1999
- Comments: The problem has been partially solved for local analytic Bruck loops in (Nagy, 2002).

=== Universally flexible loop that is not middle Bol ===
A loop is universally flexible if every one of its loop isotopes is flexible, that is, satisfies (xy)x = x(yx). A loop is middle Bol if every one of its loop isotopes has the antiautomorphic inverse property, that is, satisfies (xy)^{−1} = y^{−1}x^{−1}. Is there a finite, universally flexible loop that is not middle Bol?

- Proposed: by Michael Kinyon at Loops '03, Prague 2003

=== Finite simple Bol loop with nontrivial conjugacy classes ===
Is there a finite simple nonassociative Bol loop with nontrivial conjugacy classes?

- Proposed: by Kenneth W. Johnson and Jonathan D. H. Smith at the 2nd Mile High Conference on Nonassociative Mathematics, Denver 2009

== Open problems (Nilpotency and solvability) ==
=== Niemenmaa's conjecture and related problems ===
Let Q be a loop whose inner mapping group is nilpotent. Is Q nilpotent? Is Q solvable?

- Proposed: at Loops '03 and '07, Prague 2003 and 2007
- Comments: The answer to the first question is affirmative if Q is finite (Niemenmaa 2009). The problem is open in the general case.

=== Loops with abelian inner mapping group ===
Let Q be a loop with abelian inner mapping group. Is Q nilpotent? If so, is there a bound on the nilpotency class of Q? In particular, can the nilpotency class of Q be higher than 3?

- Proposed: at Loops '07, Prague 2007
- Comments: When the inner mapping group Inn(Q) is finite and abelian, then Q is nilpotent (Niemenaa and Kepka). The first question is therefore open only in the infinite case. Call loop Q of Csörgõ type if it is nilpotent of class at least 3, and Inn(Q) is abelian. No loop of Csörgõ type of nilpotency class higher than 3 is known. Loops of Csörgõ type exist (Csörgõ, 2004), Buchsteiner loops of Csörgõ type exist (Csörgõ, Drápal and Kinyon, 2007), and Moufang loops of Csörgõ type exist (Nagy and Vojtěchovský, 2007). On the other hand, there are no groups of Csörgõ type (folklore), there are no commutative Moufang loops of Csörgõ type (Bruck), and there are no Moufang p-loops of Csörgõ type for p > 3 (Nagy and Vojtěchovský, 2007).

=== Number of nilpotent loops up to isomorphism ===
Determine the number of nilpotent loops of order 24 up to isomorphism.

- Proposed: by Petr Vojtěchovský at the 2nd Mile High Conference on Nonassociative Mathematics, Denver 2009
- Comment: The counts are known for n < 24, see (Daly and Vojtěchovský, 2010). The number of nilpotent loops of order 24 with center of size at least 3 is 2,318,640,494,742,419,998,834, see.

=== A finite nilpotent loop without a finite basis for its laws ===
Construct a finite nilpotent loop with no finite basis for its laws.

- Proposed: by M. R. Vaughan-Lee in the Kourovka Notebook of Unsolved Problems in Group Theory
- Comment: There is a finite loop with no finite basis for its laws (Vaughan-Lee, 1979) but it is not nilpotent.

== Open problems (quasigroups) ==
=== Existence of infinite simple paramedial quasigroups ===
Are there infinite simple paramedial quasigroups?

- Proposed: by Jaroslav Ježek and Tomáš Kepka at Loops '03, Prague 2003

=== Minimal isotopically universal varieties of quasigroups ===
A variety V of quasigroups is isotopically universal if every quasigroup is isotopic to a member of V. Is the variety of loops a minimal isotopically universal variety? Does every isotopically universal variety contain the variety of loops or its parastrophes?

- Proposed: by Tomáš Kepka and Petr Němec at Loops '03, Prague 2003
- Comments: Every quasigroup is isotopic to a loop, hence the variety of loops is isotopically universal.

=== Small quasigroups with quasigroup core ===
Does there exist a quasigroup Q of order q = 14, 18, 26 or 42 such that the operation * defined on Q by x * y = y − xy is a quasigroup operation?

- Proposed: by Parascovia Syrbu at Loops '03, Prague 2003
- Comments: see (Conselo et al., 1998)

=== Uniform construction of Latin squares? ===
Construct a latin square L of order n as follows: Let G = K_{n,n} be the complete bipartite graph with distinct weights on its n^{2} edges. Let M_{1} be the cheapest matching in G, M_{2} the cheapest matching in G with M_{1} removed, and so on. Each matching M_{i} determines a permutation p_{i} of 1, ..., n. Let L be obtained from G by placing the permutation p_{i} into row i of L. Does this procedure result in a uniform distribution on the space of Latin squares of order n?

- Proposed: by Gábor Nagy at the 2nd Mile High Conference on Nonassociative Mathematics, Denver 2009

== Open problems (miscellaneous) ==
=== Bound on the size of multiplication groups ===
For a loop Q, let Mlt(Q) denote the multiplication group of Q, that is, the group generated by all left and right translations. Is |Mlt(Q)| < f(|Q|) for some variety of loops and for some polynomial f?

- Proposed: at the Milehigh conference on quasigroups, loops, and nonassociative systems, Denver 2005

=== Does every finite alternative loop have 2-sided inverses? ===
Does every finite alternative loop, that is, every loop satisfying x(xy) = (xx)y and x(yy) = (xy)y, have 2-sided inverses?

- Proposed: by Warren D. Smith
- Comments: There are infinite alternative loops without 2-sided inverses, cf. (Ormes and Vojtěchovský, 2007). It is known that every finite alternative loop of order at most 185 has 2-sided inverses, cf..

=== Finite simple nonassociative automorphic loop ===
Find a nonassociative finite simple automorphic loop, if such a loop exists.

- Proposed: by Michael Kinyon at Loops '03, Prague 2003
- Comments: It is known that such a loop cannot be commutative (Grishkov, Kinyon and Nagý, 2013) nor have odd order (Kinyon, Kunen, Phillips and Vojtěchovský, 2013).

=== Universality of Osborn loops ===
A loop is Osborn if it satisfies the identity x((yz)x) = (x^{λ}\y)(zx). Is every Osborn loop universal, that is, is every isotope of an Osborn loop Osborn? If not, is there a nice identity characterizing universal Osborn loops?

- Proposed: by Michael Kinyon at Milehigh conference on quasigroups, loops, and nonassociative systems, Denver 2005
- Comments: Moufang and conjugacy closed loops are Osborn. See (Kinyon, 2005) for more.

== Solved problems ==
The following problems were posed as open at various conferences and have since been solved.

=== Buchsteiner loop that is not conjugacy closed ===
Is there a Buchsteiner loop that is not conjugacy closed? Is there a finite simple Buchsteiner loop that is not conjugacy closed?

- Proposed: at Milehigh conference on quasigroups, loops, and nonassociative systems, Denver 2005
- Solved by: Piroska Csörgõ, Aleš Drápal, and Michael Kinyon
- Solution: The quotient of a Buchsteiner loop by its nucleus is an abelian group of exponent 4. In particular, no nonassociative Buchsteiner loop can be simple. There exists a Buchsteiner loop of order 128 which is not conjugacy closed.

=== Classification of Moufang loops of order 64 ===
Classify nonassociative Moufang loops of order 64.

- Proposed: at Milehigh conference on quasigroups, loops, and nonassociative systems, Denver 2005
- Solved by: Gábor P. Nagy and Petr Vojtěchovský
- Solution: There are 4262 nonassociative Moufang loops of order 64. They were found by the method of group modifications in (Vojtěchovský, 2006), and it was shown in (Nagy and Vojtěchovský, 2007) that the list is complete. The latter paper uses a linear-algebraic approach to Moufang loop extensions.

=== Conjugacy closed loop with nonisomorphic one-sided multiplication groups ===
Construct a conjugacy closed loop whose left multiplication group is not isomorphic to its right multiplication group.

- Proposed: by Aleš Drápal at Loops '03, Prague 2003
- Solved by: Aleš Drápal
- Solution: There is such a loop of order 9. In can be obtained in the LOOPS package by the command CCLoop(9,1)

=== Existence of a finite simple Bol loop ===
Is there a finite simple Bol loop that is not Moufang?

- Proposed at: Loops '99, Prague 1999
- Solved by: Gábor P. Nagy, 2007.
- Solution: A simple Bol loop that is not Moufang will be called proper.
  There are several families of proper simple Bol loops. A smallest proper simple Bol loop is of order 24 (Nagy 2008).
  There is also a proper simple Bol loop of exponent 2 (Nagy 2009), and a proper simple Bol loop of odd order (Nagy 2008).
- Comments: The above constructions solved two additional open problems:
  - Is there a finite simple Bruck loop that is not Moufang? Yes, since any proper simple Bol loop of exponent 2 is Bruck.
  - Is every Bol loop of odd order solvable? No, as witnessed by any proper simple Bol loop of odd order.

=== Left Bol loop with trivial right nucleus ===
Is there a finite non-Moufang left Bol loop with trivial right nucleus?

- Proposed: at Milehigh conference on quasigroups, loops, and nonassociative systems, Denver 2005
- Solved by: Gábor P. Nagy, 2007
- Solution: There is a finite simple left Bol loop of exponent 2 of order 96 with trivial right nucleus. Also, using an exact factorization of the Mathieu group M_{24}, it is possible to construct a non-Moufang simple Bol loop which is a G-loop.

=== Lagrange property for Moufang loops ===
Does every finite Moufang loop have the strong Lagrange property?

- Proposed: by Orin Chein at Loops '99, Prague 1999
- Solved by: Alexander Grishkov and Andrei Zavarnitsine, 2003
- Solution: Every finite Moufang loop has the strong Lagrange property (SLP). Here is an outline of the proof:
  - According to (Chein et al. 2003), it suffices to show SLP for nonassociative finite simple Moufang loops (NFSML).
  - It thus suffices to show that the order of a maximal subloop of an NFSML L divides the order of L.
  - A countable class of NFSMLs $M(q)$ was discovered in (Paige 1956), and no other NSFMLs exist by (Liebeck 1987).
  - Grishkov and Zavarnitsine matched maximal subloops of loops $M(q)$ with certain subgroups of groups with triality in (Grishkov and Zavarnitsine, 2003).

=== Moufang loops of order p^{2}q^{3} and pq^{4} ===
Let p and q be distinct odd primes. If q is not congruent to 1 modulo p, are all Moufang loops of order p^{2}q^{3} groups? What about pq^{4}?

- Proposed: by Andrew Rajah at Loops '99, Prague 1999
- Comments: The former has been solved positively (that is, only groups exist) by Rajah and Chee (2011) where they showed that for distinct odd primes p_{1} < ··· < p_{m} < q < r_{1} < ··· < r_{n}, all Moufang loops of order p_{1}^{2}···p_{m}^{2}q^{3}r_{1}^{2}···r_{n}^{2} are groups if and only if q is not congruent to 1 modulo p_{i} for each i. The latter has been solved positively by Rajah and Chee (2014).

=== Moufang loops with non-normal commutant ===
Is there a Moufang loop whose commutant is not normal?

- Proposed: by Andrew Rajah at Loops '03, Prague 2003
- Solved by: Alexander Grishkov and Andrei Zavarnitsine, 2017
- Solution: Yes, there is a Moufang loop of order 3^{8} with non-normal commutant. Gagola had previously claimed the opposite, but later found a hole in his proof.

=== Moufang theorem in non-Moufang loops ===
We say that a variety V of loops satisfies the Moufang theorem if for every loop Q in V the following implication holds: for every x, y, z in Q, if x(yz) = (xy)z then the subloop generated by x, y, z is a group. Is every variety that satisfies Moufang theorem contained in the variety of Moufang loops?

- Proposed by: Andrew Rajah at Loops '11, Třešť 2011
- Solved by: Solved negatively by Aleš Drápal and Petr Vojtěchovský, 2020, cf. the variety of Steiner loops satisfying the identity (xz)(((xy)z)(yz)) = ((xz)((xy)z))(yz). Also see Rasskazova, 2020 and Aleš Drápal and Petr Vojtěchovský, 2024.

=== Quasivariety of cores of Bol loops ===
Is the class of cores of Bol loops a quasivariety?

- Proposed: by Jonathan D. H. Smith and Alena Vanžurová at Loops '03, Prague 2003
- Solved by: Alena Vanžurová, 2004.
- Solution: No, the class of cores of Bol loops is not closed under subalgebras. Furthermore, the class of cores of groups is not closed under subalgebras. Here is an outline of the proof:
  - Cores of abelian groups are medial, by (Romanowska and Smith, 1985), (Rozskowska-Lech, 1999).
  - The smallest nonabelian group $S_3$ has core containing a submagma $G$ of order 4 that is not medial.
  - If $G$ is a core of a Bol loop, it is a core of a Bol loop of order 4, hence a core of an abelian group, a contradiction.

=== Parity of the number of quasigroups up to isomorphism ===
Let I(n) be the number of isomorphism classes of quasigroups of order n. Is I(n) odd for every n?

- Proposed: by Douglas S. Stones at 2nd Mile High Conference on Nonassociative Mathematics, Denver 2009
- Solved by: Douglas S. Stones, 2010.
- Solution: I(12) is even. In fact, I(n) is odd for all n ≤ 17 except 12. (Stones 2010)

=== (Phillips' problem) Odd order Moufang loop with trivial nucleus ===
Is there a Moufang loop of odd order with trivial nucleus?

- Proposed: by Andrew Rajah at Loops '03, Prague 2003
- Solved by: Piroska Csörgő, 2022.
- Solution: Every Moufang loop of odd order has nontrivial nucleus

=== Classification of finite simple paramedial quasigroups ===
Classify the finite simple paramedial quasigroups.

- Proposed: by Jaroslav Ježek and Tomáš Kepka at Loops '03, Prague 2003.
- Solved by: Victor Shcherbacov and Dumitru Pushkashu (2010).
- Solution: Any finite simple paramedial quasigroup is isotopic to elementary abelian p-group. Such quasigroup can be either a medial unipotent quasigroup, or a medial commutative distributive quasigroup, or special kind isotope of (φ+ψ)-simple medial distributive quasigroup.

== See also ==
- Problems in Latin squares
