= Bol loop =

Algebraic structure

In mathematics and abstract algebra, a Bol loop is an algebraic structure generalizing the notion of group. Bol loops are named for the Dutch mathematician Gerrit Bol who introduced them in (Bol 1937).

A loop, L, is said to be a left Bol loop if it satisfies the identity

$a(b(ac))=(a(ba))c$, for every a,b,c in L,

while L is said to be a right Bol loop if it satisfies

$((ca)b)a=c((ab)a)$, for every a,b,c in L.

These identities can be seen as weakened forms of associativity, or a strengthened form of (left or right) alternativity.

A loop is both left Bol and right Bol if and only if it is a Moufang loop. Alternatively, a right or left Bol loop is Moufang if and only if it satisfies the flexible identity a(ba) = (ab)a . Different authors use the term "Bol loop" to refer to either a left Bol or a right Bol loop.

== Properties ==
The left (right) Bol identity directly implies the left (right) alternative property, as can be shown by setting b to the identity.

It also implies the left (right) inverse property, as can be seen by setting b to the left (right) inverse of a, and using loop division to cancel the superfluous factor of a. As a result, Bol loops have two-sided inverses.

Bol loops are also power-associative.

== Bruck loops ==
A Bol loop where the aforementioned two-sided inverse satisfies the automorphic inverse property, (ab)^{−1} = a^{−1} b^{−1} for all a,b in L, is known as a (left or right) Bruck loop or K-loop (named for the American mathematician Richard Bruck). The example in the following section is a Bruck loop.

Bruck loops have applications in special relativity; see Ungar (2002). Left Bruck loops are equivalent to Ungar's (2002) gyrocommutative gyrogroups, even though the two structures are defined differently.

== Example ==
Let L denote the set of n x n positive definite, Hermitian matrices over the complex numbers. It is generally not true that the matrix product AB of matrices A, B in L is Hermitian, let alone positive definite. However, there exists a unique P in L and a unique unitary matrix U such that AB = PU; this is the polar decomposition of AB. Define a binary operation * on L by A * B = P. Then (L, *) is a left Bruck loop. An explicit formula for * is given by A * B = (A B^{2} A)^{1/2}, where the superscript 1/2 indicates the unique positive definite Hermitian square root.

== Bol algebra ==
A (left) Bol algebra is a vector space equipped with a binary operation $[a,b]+[b,a]=0$ and a ternary operation $\{a,b,c\}$ that satisfies the following identities:

$$\{a, b, c\} + \{b, a, c\} = 0$$
and
$$\{a, b, c\} + \{b, c, a\} + \{c, a, b\}= 0$$
and
$$[\{a, b, c\}, d] - [\{a, b, d\}, c] + \{c, d, [a, b]\} - \{a, b, [c, d]\}+ [[a, b],[c, d]] = 0$$
and
$$\{a, b, \{c, d, e\}\} - \{\{a, b, c\}, d, e\} - \{c, \{a, b, d\}, e\} - \{c, d, \{a, b, e\}\} = 0.$$
Note that {.,.,.} acts as a Lie triple system. If A is a left or right alternative algebra then it has an associated Bol algebra A^{b}, where $[a,b]=ab-ba$ is the commutator and $\{a,b,c\}=\langle b,c,a\rangle$ is the Jordan associator.
