= Moufang loop =

Algebraic structure

In mathematics, a Moufang loop is a special kind of algebraic structure. It is similar to a group in many ways but need not be associative. Moufang loops were introduced by Ruth Moufang (1935). Smooth Moufang loops have an associated algebra, the Malcev algebra, similar in some ways to how a Lie group has an associated Lie algebra.

== Definition ==
A Moufang loop is a loop $Q$ that satisfies the four following equivalent identities for all $x$, $y$, $z$ in $Q$ (the binary operation in $Q$ is denoted by juxtaposition):

1. $z(x(zy)) = ((zx)z)y$
2. $x(z(yz)) = ((xz)y)z$
3. $(zx)(yz) = (z(xy))z$
4. $(zx)(yz) = z((xy)z)$

These identities are known as Moufang identities.

== Examples ==
- Any group is an associative loop and therefore a Moufang loop.
- The nonzero octonions form a nonassociative Moufang loop under octonion multiplication.
- The subset of unit norm octonions (forming a 7-sphere in O) is closed under multiplication and therefore forms a Moufang loop.
- The subset of unit norm integral octonions is a finite Moufang loop of order 240.
- The basis octonions and their additive inverses form a finite Moufang loop of order 16.
- The set of invertible split-octonions forms a nonassociative Moufang loop, as does the set of unit norm split-octonions. More generally, the set of invertible elements in any octonion algebra over a field F forms a Moufang loop, as does the subset of unit norm elements.
- Multiplication in an alternative ring or alternative algebra R obey the Moufang identities, so the set of invertible elements in R form a Moufang loop called the loop of units of R.
- For any field F let M(F) denote the Moufang loop of unit norm elements in the (unique) split-octonion algebra over F. Let Z denote the center of M(F). If the characteristic of F is 2 then Z = {e}, otherwise Z = {±e}. The Paige loop over F is the loop M*(F) = M(F)/Z. Paige loops are nonassociative simple Moufang loops. All finite nonassociative simple Moufang loops are Paige loops over finite fields. The smallest Paige loop M*(2) has order 120.
- A large class of nonassociative Moufang loops can be constructed as follows. Let G be an arbitrary group. Define a new element u not in G and let M(G,2) = G ∪ (Gu). The product in M(G,2) is given by the usual product of elements in G together with:
  $$1u = u$$
  $$(gu)h = (gh^{-1})u$$
  $$g(hu) = (hg)u$$
  $$(gu)(hu) = h^{-1}g$$
  It follows that $u^2 = 1$ and $ug = g^{-1}u$. With the above product M(G,2) is a Moufang loop. It is associative if and only if G is abelian.
- The smallest nonassociative Moufang loop is M(S_{3}, 2) which has order 12.
- Richard A. Parker constructed a Moufang loop of order 2^{13}, which was used by Conway in his construction of the monster group. Parker's loop has a center of order 2 with elements denoted by 1, −1, and the quotient by the center is an elementary abelian group of order 2^{12}, identified with the binary Golay code. The loop is then defined up to isomorphism by the equations
  A^{2} = (−1)^{|A|/4}
  BA = (−1)^{|A∩B|/2}AB
  A(BC)= (−1)^{|A∩B∩C|}(AB)C

where |A| is the number of elements of the code word A, and so on. For more details see Conway, J. H.; Curtis, R. T.; Norton, S. P.; Parker, R. A.; and Wilson, R. A.: Atlas of Finite Groups: Maximal Subgroups and Ordinary Characters for Simple Groups. Oxford, England.

== Properties ==
=== Associativity ===
Moufang loops differ from groups in that they need not be associative. A Moufang loop that is associative is a group. The Moufang identities may be viewed as weaker forms of associativity.

By setting various elements to the identity, the Moufang identities imply

- x(xy) = (xx)y left alternative identity
- (xy)y = x(yy) right alternative identity
- x(yx) = (xy)x flexible identity (see flexible algebra and alternative algebra).

Moufang's theorem states that when three elements x, y, and z in a Moufang loop obey the associative law: (xy)z = x(yz) then they generate an associative subloop; that is, a group. A corollary of this is that all Moufang loops are di-associative (i.e. the subloop generated by any two elements of a Moufang loop is associative and therefore a group). In particular, Moufang loops are power associative, so that powers x^{n} are well-defined. When working with Moufang loops, it is common to drop the parenthesis in expressions with only two distinct elements. For example, the Moufang identities may be written unambiguously as

1. z(x(zy)) = (zxz)y
2. ((xz)y)z = x(zyz)
3. (zx)(yz) = z(xy)z.

=== Left and right multiplication ===
The Moufang identities can be written in terms of the left and right multiplication operators on Q. The first two identities state that

- $L_zL_xL_z(y) = L_{zxz}(y)$
- $R_zR_yR_z(x) = R_{zyz}(x)$

while the third identity says

- $L_z(x)R_z(y) = B_z(xy)$

for all $x,y,z$ in $Q$. Here $B_z = L_zR_z = R_zL_z$ is bimultiplication by $z$. The third Moufang identity is therefore equivalent to the statement that the triple $(L_z, R_z, B_z)$ is an autotopy of $Q$ for all $z$ in $Q$.

=== Inverse properties ===
All Moufang loops have the inverse property, which means that each element x has a two-sided inverse x^{−1} that satisfies the identities:

$$x^{-1}(xy) = y = (yx)x^{-1}$$

for all x and y. It follows that $(xy)^{-1} = y^{-1}x^{-1}$ and $x(yz) = e$ if and only if $(xy)z = e$.

Moufang loops are universal among inverse property loops; that is, a loop Q is a Moufang loop if and only if every loop isotope of Q has the inverse property. It follows that every loop isotope of a Moufang loop is a Moufang loop.

One can use inverses to rewrite the left and right Moufang identities in a more useful form:

- $(xy)z = (xz^{-1})(zyz)$
- $x(yz) = (xyx)(x^{-1}z).$

=== Lagrange property ===
A finite loop Q is said to have the Lagrange property if the order of every subloop of Q divides the order of Q. Lagrange's theorem in group theory states that every finite group has the Lagrange property. It was an open question for many years whether or not finite Moufang loops had Lagrange property. The question was finally resolved by Alexander Grishkov and Andrei Zavarnitsine, and independently by Stephen Gagola III and Jonathan Hall, in 2003: Every finite Moufang loop does have the Lagrange property. More results for the theory of finite groups have been generalized to Moufang loops by Stephen Gagola III in recent years.

=== Moufang quasigroups ===
Any quasigroup satisfying one of the Moufang identities must, in fact, have an identity element and therefore be a Moufang loop. We give a proof here for the third identity:

Let a be any element of Q, and let e be the unique element such that ae = a.
Then for any x in Q, (xa)x = (x(ae))x = (xa)(ex).
Cancelling xa on the left gives x = ex so that e is a left identity element.
Now for any y in Q, ye = (ey)(ee) =(e(ye))e = (ye)e.
Cancelling e on the right gives y = ye, so e is also a right identity element.
Therefore, e is a two-sided identity element.

The proofs for the first two identities are somewhat more difficult (Kunen 1996).

== Open problems ==
Phillips' problem is an open problem in the theory presented by J. D. Phillips at Loops '03 in Prague. It asks whether there exists a finite Moufang loop of odd order with a trivial nucleus.

Recall that the nucleus of a loop (or more generally a quasigroup) is the set of $x$ such that $x(yz)=(xy)z$, $y(xz)=(yx)z$ and $y(zx)=(yz)x$ hold for all $y,z$ in the loop.

See also: Problems in loop theory and quasigroup theory

== See also ==
- Malcev algebra
- Bol loop
- Gyrogroup
- Moufang plane
- Moufang polygon

== Bibliography ==
- V. D. Belousov (2001) [1994], "Moufang loop", Encyclopedia of Mathematics, EMS Press
- Goodaire, Edgar G.; May, Sean; Raman, Maitreyi (1999). The Moufang loops of order less than 64. Nova Science Publishers. ISBN 0-444-82438-3.
- Chein, Orin (1974). "Moufang loops of small order. I". Transactions of the American Mathematical Society. 188 (2): 31–51. doi:10.1090/S0002-9947-1974-0330336-3.
- Gagola III, Stephen (2011). "How and why Moufang loops behave like groups". Quasigroups and Related Systems. 19: 1–22.
- Grishkov, Alexander; Zavarnitsine, Andrei (2005). "Lagrange's theorem for Moufang loops". Mathematical Proceedings of the Cambridge Philosophical Society. 139 (1): 41–57. Bibcode:2005MPCPS.139...41G. doi:10.1017/S0305004105008388.
- Kunen, K. (1996). "Moufang quasigroups". Journal of Algebra. 183 (1): 231–4. CiteSeerX 10.1.1.52.5356. doi:10.1006/jabr.1996.0216.
- Moufang, R. (1935), "Zur Struktur von Alternativkörpern", Math. Ann., 110: 416–430, doi:10.1007/bf01448037
- Romanowska, Anna B.; Smith, Jonathan D. H. (1999). Post-Modern Algebra. Wiley-Interscience. ISBN 0-471-12738-8.
- Schafer, Richard D. (1995) [1966]. An Introduction to Nonassociative Algebras. Dover. ISBN 0-486-68813-5. Zbl 0145.25601.
