= Bioctonion =

Algebra of eight complex dimensions

In mathematics, the algebra of bioctonions, or complex octonions, is the tensor product of the algebra of octonions and the algebra of complex numbers. It is often denoted $\mathbb{O} \otimes \mathbb{C}$ or $\mathbb{O}_\mathbb{C}$.

Thus, every bioctonion can be written as a + bi where a and b are octonions. Addition of bioctonions is defined by

$(a + bi) + (c + di) = (a + b) + (c + d)i$

and multiplication of bioctonions is defined by

$(a + bi)(c + di) = (ac - bd) + (ad + bc)i.$

We can define the conjugate of a bioctonion by

$(a+bi)^* = a - b^* i.$

There is another equivalent scheme which obtains the bioctonions by repeated application of the Cayley–Dickson construction starting from the field of complex numbers, the trivial involution, and quadratic form z^{2}. Applying this construction once we obtain the biquaternions, and applying it again we obtain the bioctonions. This approach exhibits the bioctonions as an octonion algebra over the complex numbers.

Concretely, in this approach a bioctonion is written as a pair (p,q) where p and q are biquaternions. Addition of bioctonions is then defined by

$(p,q) + (r,s) = (p+r,q+s)$

while multiplication of bioctonions is defined using biquaternion multiplication and the biconjugate $p^\ast$ of a biquaternion p, as follows:

$$(p,q)(r,s) = (pr - s^* q,\ sp + q r^*).$$

In this approach the bioctonion z = (p,q) has conjugate z* = (p*, – q), and the norm N(z) of bioctonion z is z z* = p p* + q q*, which is a complex quadratic form with eight terms. For any pair of bioctonions y and z,

$$N(y z) = N(y) N(z),$$

showing that N is a quadratic form admitting composition. Thus, the bioctonions form a composition algebra over the complex numbers.

Guy Roos explained how bioctonions are used to present the exceptional symmetric domains:

The explicit description of the exceptional domains ... involves 3x3 matrices with entries in the Cayley-Graves algebra $\mathbb{O}_\mathbb{C}$ of complex octonions ... The space $H_3 (\mathbb{O}_\mathbb{C})$ of such matrices which are Hermitian with respect to the Cayley conjugation can be endowed with the structure of a Jordan algebra using a product that generalizes in a natural way the symmetrized product $x \circ y = \tfrac{1}{2} (xy + yx)$ of ordinary square matrices. This algebra is known as the Albert algebra or exceptional Jordan algebra. It is the natural place to describe the exceptional symmetric domain of dimension 27. The second exceptional symmetric domain (of complex dimension 16) lives in the space $M_{2,1}(\mathbb{O}_\mathbb{C})$ of 2x1 matrices with octonion entries.

Complex octonions have been used to describe the generations of quarks and leptons.
