= Françoise Chatelin =

French mathematician

Françoise Chatelin (née Laborde, 1941–2020; also published as Françoise Chaitin-Chatelin) was a French mathematician whose research interests included spectral theory, numerical analysis, scientific computing, and the Cayley–Dickson construction.

== Life ==
Chatelin was born on 21 September 1941 in Grenoble. Through study at the École normale supérieure (Paris) she earned an agrégation in mathematics in 1963. She completed a state doctorate in 1971, at the University of Grenoble. Her doctoral dissertation, Numerical methods for calculating eigenvalues and eigenvectors of a linear operator, was directed by Noël Gastinel.

The University of Grenoble split into three at the beginning of the 1970s (later re-merged into Grenoble Alpes University). Although her doctoral work was through the part focused on the sciences, which became known as Joseph Fourier University, from 1971 to 1984 she held a position as professor of applied mathematics in the part focused on the social sciences, the Université des Sciences Sociales de Grenoble, later Université Pierre Mendès France. There, she directed the applied mathematics department of IMAG, the Institut d'informatique et mathématiques appliquées de Grenoble, from 1977 to 1981, and was an associate director of IMAG. From 1982 to 1983 she directed the university research school (EUR) of economics at the Université des Sciences Sociales de Grenoble. Next, she was briefly part of Paris Dauphine University, from 1984 to 1985.

From 1985 to 1991 she left academia to work in industry, as a researcher in scientific computation for IBM in Paris. From 1992 to 1993 she headed the mathematics and computer science group at the research laboratory of Thomson-CSF.

Returning to a position as professor of applied mathematics, she was affiliated again with Paris Dauphine University from 1993 to 1996, before moving to Toulouse Capitole University in 1996. During this time, she also headed the qualitative computing group at CERFACS, the Centre Européen de Recherche et de Formation Avancée en Calcul Scientifique in Toulouse. She retired as a professor emeritus in 2015.

She died on 14 May 2020. A conference in her honor was held in Toulouse in October 2021.

== Books ==
Chatelin's books included:

- Spectral Approximation of Linear Operators (Academic Press, 1983; SIAM, Classics in Applied Mathematics 65, 2011; Chinese translation, Tianjin University Press, 1987)
- Problem Solving Environments for Scientific Computing (edited with B. Ford, North Holland, 1987)
- Eigenvalues of Matrices (Valeurs Propres de Matrices, Masson, 1988; separate volume of exercises, Masson, 1989; English translations, Wiley, 1993, and SIAM, Classics in Applied Mathematics 71, 2013; Japanese translation, Springer, 1993)
- Lectures on Finite Precision Computations (with Valérie Frayssé, SIAM, 1996)
- Qualitative Computing: A Computational Journey into Nonlinearity (World Scientific, 2012)
