= Hyperbolic trigonometry =

In mathematics, hyperbolic trigonometry can mean:

- The study of hyperbolic triangles in hyperbolic geometry (traditional trigonometry is the study of triangles in plane geometry)
- The use of the hyperbolic functions
- The use of gyrotrigonometry in hyperbolic geometry
