= Alternativity =

Property of a binary operation

In abstract algebra, alternativity is a property of a binary operation. A magma G is said to be left alternative if $(xx)y = x(xy)$ for all $x, y \in G$ and right alternative if $y(xx) = (yx)x$ for all $x, y \in G$. A magma that is both left and right alternative is said to be alternative.

Any associative magma (that is, a semigroup) is alternative. More generally, a magma in which every pair of elements generates an associative submagma must be alternative. The converse, however, is not true, in contrast to the situation in alternative algebras.

== Examples ==
Examples of algebraic structures with an alternative multiplication include:

- Any semigroup is associative and therefore alternative.
- Moufang loops are alternative and flexible but generally not associative. See Moufang loop § Examples for more examples.
- Octonion multiplication is alternative and flexible. The same is more generally true for any octonion algebra.
- Applying the Cayley-Dickson construction once to a commutative ring with a trivial involution $a^\ast = a$ gives a commutative associative algebra. Applying it twice gives an associative algebra. Applying it three times gives an alternative algebra. Applying it four or more times gives an algebra that is typically not alternative (counterexamples can be found with characteristic two). An example is the sequence $\mathbb{R}, \mathbb{C}, \mathbb{H}, \mathbb{O}, \mathbb{S},...$ where $\mathbb{H}$ is the algebra of quaternions, $\mathbb{O}$ is the algebra of octonions, and $\mathbb{S}$ is the algebras of sedenions.

== See also ==
- Flexible algebra
- Power associativity
