= Normed algebra =

In mathematics, a normed algebra A is an algebra over a field which has a sub-multiplicative norm:

$$\forall x,y\in A\qquad \|xy\|\le\|x\|\|y\|.$$

Some authors require it to have a multiplicative identity 1_{A} such that ‖1_{A}‖ = 1.

== See also ==
- Banach algebra
- Composition algebra
- Hurwitz's theorem (composition algebras)
- Division algebra
- Gelfand–Mazur theorem

== External reading ==
- "Normed Algebra". Encyclopaedia of Mathematics.
