= Petersson algebra =

In mathematics, a Petersson algebra is a composition algebra over a field constructed from an order-3 automorphism of a Hurwitz algebra. They were first constructed by Petersson (1969).

== Construction ==
Suppose that C is a Hurwitz algebra and φ is an automorphism of order 3. Define the new product of x and y to be φ(x̅)φ^{2}(y̅). With this new product the algebra is called a Petersson algebra.
