= Gerrit Bol =

Dutch mathematician (1906–1989)

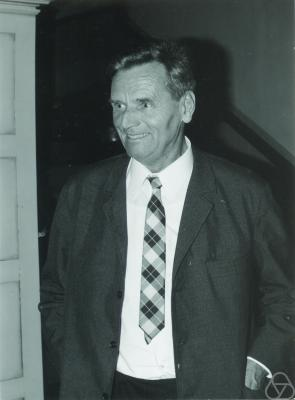
- Gerrit Bol in 1970
- Born: 29 May 1906; Amsterdam, Netherlands
- Died: 21 February 1989 (aged 82); Freiburg, West Germany
- Citizenship: Netherlands
- Education: Leiden University, 1928
- Known for: Bol loop, Bol's conjecture
- Scientific career
- Fields: Mathematics
- Workplaces: Leiden University, University of Hamburg, University of Freiburg
- Doctoral advisor: Willem van der Woude
- Doctoral students: Martin Barner

Gerrit Bol (May 29, 1906 – February 21, 1989) was a Dutch mathematician who specialized in geometry. He is known for introducing Bol loops in 1937, and Bol's conjecture on sextactic points.

== Life ==
Bol earned his PhD in 1928 at Leiden University under Willem van der Woude. In the 1930s, he worked at the University of Hamburg on the geometry of webs under Wilhelm Blaschke and later projective differential geometry. In 1931 he earned a habilitation.

In 1933 Bol signed the Loyalty Oath of German Professors to Adolf Hitler and the National Socialist State.

In 1942–1945 during World War II, Bol fought on the Dutch side, and was taken prisoner. On the authority of Blaschke, he was released. After the war, Bol became professor at the Albert-Ludwigs-University of Freiburg, until retirement there in 1971.

== Works ==
- G. Bol (1934). "Über Drei-Gewebe im vierdimensionalen Raum". Vol. 110. Mathematische Annalen. pp. 431–463.
- G. Bol (1938). "mit Wilhelm Blaschke: Geometrie der Gewebe. Topologische Fragen der Differentialgeometrie". Julius Springer, Berlin.
- G. Bol (1942). "Über Eikörper mit Vieleckschatten". Vol. 48. Mathematische Zeitschrift. pp. 227–246.
- G. Bol (1948). Elemente der analytischen Geometrie. Vol. 1. Vandenhoeck & Ruprecht, Göttingen.
- G. Bol (1949). Elemente der analytischen Geometrie. Vol. 2. Vandenhoeck & Ruprecht, Göttingen.
- G. Bol (1950). Projektive Differentialgeometrie. Vol. 1. Vandenhoeck & Ruprecht, Göttingen.
- G. Bol (1954). Projektive Differentialgeometrie. Vol. 2. Vandenhoeck & Ruprecht, Göttingen.
- G. Bol (1967). Projektive Differentialgeometrie. Vol. 3. Vandenhoeck & Ruprecht, Göttingen.
