= Division algebra =

Algebra over a field with only invertible elements and zero

In abstract algebra, a division algebra is, roughly speaking, an algebra over a field in which division, except by zero, is always possible. The multiplication operation of a division algebra is not assumed to be necessarily either commutative or associative.

== Definitions ==
Formally, suppose that D is a non-zero algebra over a field. Then D is a division algebra if, for every element a in D and every non-zero element b in D, there exists precisely one element x in D with a = bx and precisely one element y in D such that a = yb.

For associative algebras, the definition can be simplified as follows: a non-zero associative algebra over a field is a division algebra if and only if it has a multiplicative identity element 1 and every non-zero element a has a multiplicative inverse, that is, an element x with ax = xa = 1.

== Associative division algebras ==
The best-known examples of associative division algebras are the finite-dimensional real ones (that is, algebras over the field R of real numbers that are finite-dimensional as a vector space over R). The Frobenius theorem states that up to isomorphism there are three such algebras: the reals themselves (dimension 1), the field of complex numbers (dimension 2), and the quaternions (dimension 4).

Wedderburn's little theorem states that if D is a finite division algebra, then D is a finite field.

Over an algebraically closed field K (such as the complex numbers C), there are no finite-dimensional associative division algebras other than K itself.

Associative division algebras have no nonzero zero divisors. A finite-dimensional unital associative algebra (over any field) is a division algebra if and only if it has no nonzero zero divisors. Indeed, if $a$ is a member of a finite dimensional associative algebra $A$, then having no zero divisors implies that the linear operator $L_a = x \mapsto ax : A\to A$ is injective, and therefore surjective, i.e., $L_ax = 1$ has a solution.

Whenever A is an associative unital algebra over the field F and S is a simple module over A, then the endomorphism ring of S is a division algebra over F; every associative division algebra over F arises in this fashion.

The center of an associative division algebra D over the field K is a field containing K. The dimension of such an algebra over its center, if finite, is a perfect square: it is equal to the square of the dimension of a maximal subfield of D over the center. Given a field F, the Brauer equivalence classes of simple (contains only trivial two-sided ideals) associative division algebras whose center is F and which are finite-dimensional over F can be turned into a group, the Brauer group of the field F.

One way to construct finite-dimensional associative division algebras over arbitrary fields is given by the quaternion algebras (see also Quaternion).

For infinite-dimensional associative division algebras, the most important cases are those where the space has some reasonable topology. See for example Normed division algebra and Banach algebra.

== Not necessarily associative division algebras ==
If the division algebra is not assumed to be associative, usually some weaker condition (such as alternativity or power associativity) is imposed instead. See Algebra over a field for a list of such conditions.

Over the reals there are (up to isomorphism) only two unitary commutative finite-dimensional division algebras: the reals themselves, and the complex numbers. These are of course both associative. For a non-associative example, consider the complex numbers with multiplication defined by taking the complex conjugate of the usual multiplication:

a ∗ b = a̅b̅.

This is a commutative, non-associative division algebra of dimension 2 over the reals, and has no unit element. There are infinitely many other non-isomorphic commutative, non-associative, finite-dimensional real divisional algebras, but they all have dimension 2.

In fact, every finite-dimensional real commutative division algebra is either 1- or 2-dimensional. This is known as Hopf's theorem, and was proved in 1940. The proof uses methods from topology. Although a later proof was found using algebraic geometry, no direct algebraic proof is known. The fundamental theorem of algebra is a corollary of Hopf's theorem.

Dropping the requirement of commutativity, Hopf generalized his result: Any finite-dimensional real division algebra must have dimension a power of 2.

Later work showed that in fact, any finite-dimensional real division algebra must be of dimension 1, 2, 4, or 8. This was independently proved by Michel Kervaire and John Milnor in 1958, again using techniques of algebraic topology, in particular K-theory. Adolf Hurwitz had shown in 1898 that the identity qq̅ = sum of squares held only for dimensions 1, 2, 4 and 8. (See Hurwitz's theorem.) The challenge of constructing a division algebra of three dimensions was tackled by several early mathematicians. Kenneth O. May surveyed these attempts in 1966.

Any real finite-dimensional division algebra over the reals must be

- isomorphic to R or C if unitary and commutative (equivalently: associative and commutative)
- isomorphic to the quaternions if noncommutative but associative
- isomorphic to the octonions if non-associative but alternative.

The following is known about the dimension of a finite-dimensional division algebra A over a field K:

- dim A = 1 if K is algebraically closed,
- dim A = 1, 2, 4 or 8 if K is real closed, and
- If K is neither algebraically nor real closed, then there are infinitely many dimensions in which there exist division algebras over K.

We may say an algebra A has multiplicative inverses if for any nonzero a ∈ A there is an element a^{−1} ∈ A with aa^{−1} = a^{−1}a = 1. An associative algebra has multiplicative inverses if and only if it is a division algebra. However, this fails for nonassociative algebras. The sedenions are a nonassociative algebra over the real numbers that has multiplicative inverses, but is not a division algebra. On the other hand, we can construct a division algebra without multiplicative inverses by taking the quaternions and modifying the product, setting i^{2} = −1 + εj for some small nonzero real number ε while leaving the rest of the multiplication table unchanged. The element i then has both right and left inverses, but they are not equal.

== See also ==
- Normed division algebra
- Division (mathematics)
- Division ring
- Semifield
- Cayley–Dickson construction
