= Flexible algebra =

Algebraic structure

In mathematics, particularly abstract algebra, a binary operation • on a set is flexible if it satisfies the flexible identity:
$$a \bullet \left(b \bullet a\right) = \left(a \bullet b\right) \bullet a$$
for any two elements a and b of the set. A magma (that is, a set equipped with a binary operation) is flexible if the binary operation with which it is equipped is flexible. Similarly, a nonassociative algebra is flexible if its multiplication operator is flexible.

Every commutative or associative operation is flexible, so flexibility becomes important for binary operations that are neither commutative nor associative, e.g. for the multiplication of sedenions, which are not even alternative.

In 1954, Richard D. Schafer examined the algebras generated by the Cayley–Dickson process over a field and showed that they satisfy the flexible identity.

== Examples ==
Besides associative algebras, the following classes of nonassociative algebras are flexible:

- Alternative algebras
- Lie algebras
- Jordan algebras (which are commutative)
- Okubo algebras

In the world of magmas, there is only a binary multiplication operation with no addition or scaling with from a base ring or field like in algebras. In this setting, alternative and commutative magmas are all flexible - the alternative and commutative laws all imply flexibility. This includes many important classes of magmas: all groups, semigroups and moufang loops are flexible.

The sedenions and trigintaduonions, and all algebras constructed from these by iterating the Cayley–Dickson construction, are also flexible.

== See also ==
- Zorn ring
- Maltsev algebra
