= Zorn ring =

In mathematics, specifically algebra, a Zorn ring is an alternative ring in which for every non-nilpotent x there exists an element y such that xy is a non-zero idempotent. They are named after Max August Zorn, who studied a similar condition.

For associative rings, an equivalent definition is that the Jacobson radical J(R) is a nil ideal and every right ideal of R which is not contained in J(R) contains a nonzero idempotent. Replacing "right ideal" with "left ideal" yields an equivalent definition. Left or right Artinian rings, left or right perfect rings, semiprimary rings and von Neumann regular rings are all examples of associative Zorn rings.
