= Nil-Coxeter algebra =

In mathematics, the nil-Coxeter algebra, introduced by Fomin & Stanley (1994), is an algebra similar to the group algebra of a Coxeter group except that the generators are nilpotent.

== Definition ==
The nil-Coxeter algebra for the infinite symmetric group is the algebra generated by u_{1}, u_{2}, u_{3}, ... with the relations

$$\begin{align}
u_i^2 & = 0, \\
u_i u_j & = u_j u_i & & \text{ if } |i-j| > 1, \\
u_i u_j u_i & = u_j u_i u_j & & \text{ if } |i-j|=1.
\end{align}$$

These are just the relations for the infinite braid group, together with the relations u^{2}_{i} = 0. Similarly one can define a nil-Coxeter algebra for any Coxeter system, by adding the relations u^{2}_{i} = 0 to the relations of the corresponding generalized braid group.
