= Octonion algebra =

In mathematics, an octonion algebra or Cayley algebra over a field F is a unital composition algebra over F that has dimension 8 over F. In other words, it is a 8-dimensional unital non-associative algebra A over F with a non-degenerate quadratic form N (called the norm form) such that

$$N(xy) = N(x)N(y)$$

for all x and y in A.

The most well-known example of an octonion algebra is the classical octonions, which are an octonion algebra over R, the field of real numbers. The split-octonions also form an octonion algebra over R. Up to R-algebra isomorphism, these are the only octonion algebras over the reals. The algebra of bioctonions is the octonion algebra over the complex numbers C.

The octonion algebra for N is a division algebra if and only if the form N is anisotropic. A split octonion algebra is one for which the quadratic form N is isotropic (i.e., there exists a non-zero vector x with N(x) = 0). Up to F-algebra isomorphism, there is a unique split octonion algebra over any field F. When F is algebraically closed or a finite field, these are the only octonion algebras over F. For instance, when F is the field of real numbers, the algebra is split-octonions.

Octonion algebras are always non-associative. They are, however, alternative algebras, alternativity being a weaker form of associativity. Moreover, the Moufang identities hold in any octonion algebra. It follows that the invertible elements in any octonion algebra form a Moufang loop, as do the elements of unit norm.

The construction of general octonion algebras over an arbitrary field k was described by Leonard Dickson in his book Algebren und ihre Zahlentheorie (1927) (Seite 264) and repeated by Max Zorn. The product depends on selection of a γ from k. Given q and Q from a quaternion algebra over k, the octonion is written q + Qe. Another octonion may be written r + Re. Then with * denoting the conjugation in the quaternion algebra, their product is

$$(q + Qe)(r + Re) = (qr + \gamma R^* Q) + (Rq + Q r^* )e .$$

Zorn's German language description of this Cayley–Dickson construction contributed to the persistent use of this eponym describing the construction of composition algebras.

Cohl Furey has proposed that octonion algebras can be utilized in an attempt to reconcile components of the Standard Model.

Note that octonion algebras are specifically unital composition algebras. However, non-unital 8 dimensional composition algebras also exist, such as Okubo algebras.

== Classification ==
It is a theorem of Adolf Hurwitz that the F-isomorphism classes of the norm form are in one-to-one correspondence with the isomorphism classes of octonion F-algebras. Moreover, the possible norm forms are exactly the Pfister 3-forms over F.

Since any two octonion F-algebras become isomorphic over the algebraic closure of F, one can apply the ideas of non-abelian Galois cohomology. In particular, by using the fact that the automorphism group of the split octonions is the split algebraic group G_{2}, one sees the correspondence of isomorphism classes of octonion F-algebras with isomorphism classes of G_{2}-torsors over F. These isomorphism classes form the non-abelian Galois cohomology set $H^1(F, G_2)$.
