= Sedenion =

Hypercomplex number system

Sedenions
- Symbol: $\mathbb S$
- Type: Hypercomplex algebra
- Units: e_{0}, ..., e_{15}
- Multiplicative identity: e_{0}
- Main properties: Flexibility; Power associativity; Distributivity

In abstract algebra, the sedenions form a 16-dimensional noncommutative and nonassociative algebra over the real numbers, usually represented by the capital letter S, boldface S or blackboard bold $\mathbb S$.

The sedenions are obtained by applying the Cayley–Dickson construction to the octonions, which can be mathematically expressed as $\mathbb{S}=\mathcal{CD}(\mathbb{O},1)$. As such, the octonions are isomorphic to a subalgebra of the sedenions. Unlike the octonions, the sedenions are not an alternative algebra. Applying the Cayley–Dickson construction to the sedenions yields a 32-dimensional algebra, called the trigintaduonions or sometimes the 32-nions.

The term sedenion is also used for other 16-dimensional algebraic structures, such as a tensor product of two copies of the biquaternions, or the algebra of 4 × 4 matrices over the real numbers, or that studied by Smith (1995).

== History ==
The term sedenion was first mentioned by English mathematician James Joseph Sylvester in an 1884 paper titled On quaternions, nonions, sedenions, etc. In 1919, sedenions were elaborated on by Leonard Eugene Dickson.

== Arithmetic ==
A visualization of a 4D extension to the cubic octonion, showing the 35 triads as hyperplanes through the real $(e_0)$ vertex of the sedenion example given

Every sedenion is a linear combination of the unit sedenions $e_0$, $e_1$, $e_2$, $e_3$, ..., $e_{15}$, which form a basis of the vector space of sedenions. Every sedenion can be represented in the form

$$x = x_0 e_0 + x_1 e_1 + x_2 e_2 + \cdots + x_{14} e_{14} + x_{15} e_{15}.$$

Addition and subtraction are defined by the addition and subtraction of corresponding coefficients and multiplication is distributive over addition.

Like other algebras based on the Cayley–Dickson construction, the sedenions contain the algebra they were constructed from. So they contain the octonions (generated by $e_0$ to $e_7$ in the table below), and therefore also the quaternions (generated by $e_0$ to $e_3$), complex numbers (generated by $e_0$ and $e_1$) and real numbers (generated by $e_0$).

=== Multiplication ===
Like octonions, multiplication of sedenions is neither commutative nor associative. However, in contrast to the octonions, the sedenions do not even have the property of being alternative. They do, however, have the property of power associativity, that is, for any element $x$ of $\mathbb{S}$, $x^n$ is well defined. They are also flexible.

The sedenions have a multiplicative identity element $e_0$ and multiplicative inverses, but they are not a division algebra because they have zero divisors: two nonzero sedenions can be multiplied to obtain zero, for example $(e_3 + e_{10})(e_6 - e_{15})$. All hypercomplex number systems after sedenions that are based on the Cayley–Dickson construction also contain zero divisors.

The sedenion multiplication table is shown below:

$e_ie_j$		$e_j$															
$e_ie_j$		$e_0$	$e_1$	$e_2$	$e_3$	$e_4$	$e_5$	$e_6$	$e_7$	$e_8$	$e_9$	$e_{10}$	$e_{11}$	$e_{12}$	$e_{13}$	$e_{14}$	$e_{15}$
$e_i$	$e_0$	$e_0$	$e_1$	$e_2$	$e_3$	$e_4$	$e_5$	$e_6$	$e_7$	$e_8$	$e_9$	$e_{10}$	$e_{11}$	$e_{12}$	$e_{13}$	$e_{14}$	$e_{15}$
$e_i$	$e_1$	$e_1$	$-e_0$	$e_3$	$-e_2$	$e_5$	$-e_4$	$-e_7$	$e_6$	$e_9$	$-e_8$	$-e_{11}$	$e_{10}$	$-e_{13}$	$e_{12}$	$e_{15}$	$-e_{14}$
$e_i$	$e_2$	$e_2$	$-e_3$	$-e_0$	$e_1$	$e_6$	$e_7$	$-e_4$	$-e_5$	$e_{10}$	$e_{11}$	$-e_8$	$-e_9$	$-e_{14}$	$-e_{15}$	$e_{12}$	$e_{13}$
$e_i$	$e_3$	$e_3$	$e_2$	$-e_1$	$-e_0$	$e_7$	$-e_6$	$e_5$	$-e_4$	$e_{11}$	$-e_{10}$	$e_9$	$-e_8$	$-e_{15}$	$e_{14}$	$-e_{13}$	$e_{12}$
$e_i$	$e_4$	$e_4$	$-e_5$	$-e_6$	$-e_7$	$-e_0$	$e_1$	$e_2$	$e_3$	$e_{12}$	$e_{13}$	$e_{14}$	$e_{15}$	$-e_8$	$-e_9$	$-e_{10}$	$-e_{11}$
$e_i$	$e_5$	$e_5$	$e_4$	$-e_7$	$e_6$	$-e_1$	$-e_0$	$-e_3$	$e_2$	$e_{13}$	$-e_{12}$	$e_{15}$	$-e_{14}$	$e_9$	$-e_8$	$e_{11}$	$-e_{10}$
$e_i$	$e_6$	$e_6$	$e_7$	$e_4$	$-e_5$	$-e_2$	$e_3$	$-e_0$	$-e_1$	$e_{14}$	$-e_{15}$	$-e_{12}$	$e_{13}$	$e_{10}$	$-e_{11}$	$-e_8$	$e_9$
$e_i$	$e_7$	$e_7$	$-e_6$	$e_5$	$e_4$	$-e_3$	$-e_2$	$e_1$	$-e_0$	$e_{15}$	$e_{14}$	$-e_{13}$	$-e_{12}$	$e_{11}$	$e_{10}$	$-e_9$	$-e_8$
$e_i$	$e_8$	$e_8$	$-e_9$	$-e_{10}$	$-e_{11}$	$-e_{12}$	$-e_{13}$	$-e_{14}$	$-e_{15}$	$-e_0$	$e_1$	$e_2$	$e_3$	$e_4$	$e_5$	$e_6$	$e_7$
$e_i$	$e_9$	$e_9$	$e_8$	$-e_{11}$	$e_{10}$	$-e_{13}$	$e_{12}$	$e_{15}$	$-e_{14}$	$-e_1$	$-e_0$	$-e_3$	$e_2$	$-e_5$	$e_4$	$e_7$	$-e_6$
$e_i$	$e_{10}$	$e_{10}$	$e_{11}$	$e_8$	$-e_9$	$-e_{14}$	$-e_{15}$	$e_{12}$	$e_{13}$	$-e_2$	$e_3$	$-e_0$	$-e_1$	$-e_6$	$-e_7$	$e_4$	$e_5$
$e_i$	$e_{11}$	$e_{11}$	$-e_{10}$	$e_9$	$e_8$	$-e_{15}$	$e_{14}$	$-e_{13}$	$e_{12}$	$-e_3$	$-e_2$	$e_1$	$-e_0$	$-e_7$	$e_6$	$-e_5$	$e_4$
$e_i$	$e_{12}$	$e_{12}$	$e_{13}$	$e_{14}$	$e_{15}$	$e_8$	$-e_9$	$-e_{10}$	$-e_{11}$	$-e_4$	$e_5$	$e_6$	$e_7$	$-e_0$	$-e_1$	$-e_2$	$-e_3$
$e_i$	$e_{13}$	$e_{13}$	$-e_{12}$	$e_{15}$	$-e_{14}$	$e_9$	$e_8$	$e_{11}$	$-e_{10}$	$-e_5$	$-e_4$	$e_7$	$-e_6$	$e_1$	$-e_0$	$e_3$	$-e_2$
$e_i$	$e_{14}$	$e_{14}$	$-e_{15}$	$-e_{12}$	$e_{13}$	$e_{10}$	$-e_{11}$	$e_8$	$e_9$	$-e_6$	$-e_7$	$-e_4$	$e_5$	$e_2$	$-e_3$	$-e_0$	$e_1$
$e_i$	$e_{15}$	$e_{15}$	$e_{14}$	$-e_{13}$	$-e_{12}$	$e_{11}$	$e_{10}$	$-e_9$	$e_8$	$-e_7$	$e_6$	$-e_5$	$-e_4$	$e_3$	$e_2$	$-e_1$	$-e_0$

Comparison of multiplication with other algebras

=== Sedenion properties ===
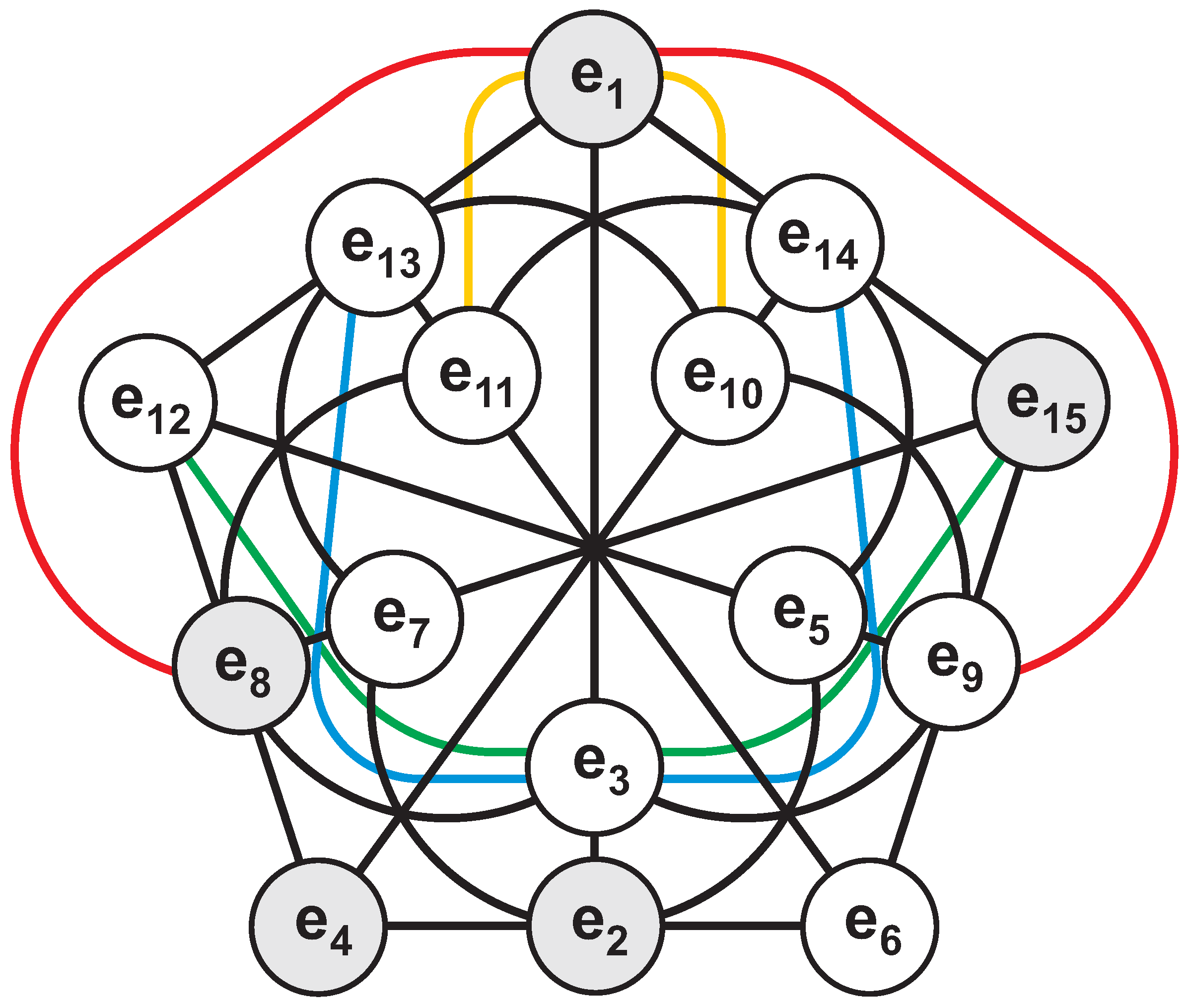
An illustration of the structure of PG(3,2) that provides the multiplication law for sedenions, as shown by Saniga, Holweck & Pracna (2015). Any three points (representing three sedenion imaginary units) lying on the same line are such that the product of two of them yields the third one, sign disregarded.

From the above table, we can see that:

$$e_0e_i = e_ie_0 = e_i \, \text{for all} \, i,$$

$e_ie_i = -e_0 \,\, \text{for}\,\, i \neq 0,$ and

$$e_ie_j = -e_je_i \,\, \text{for}\,\, i \neq j \,\,\text{with}\,\, i,j \neq 0.$$

==== Anti-associative ====
The sedenions are not fully anti-associative. Choose any four generators, $i,j,k$ and $l$. The following 5-cycle shows that these five relations cannot all be anti-associative.

$$(ij)(kl) = -((ij)k)l = (i(jk))l = -i((jk)l) = i(j(kl)) = -(ij)(kl)$$

In particular, in the table above, using $e_1,e_2,e_4$ and $e_8$ the last expression associates. $(e_1e_2)e_{12} = e_1(e_2e_{12}) = -e_{15}$

=== Quaternionic subalgebras ===
The particular sedenion multiplication table shown above is represented by 35 triads. The table and its triads have been constructed from an octonion represented by the bolded set of 7 triads using Cayley–Dickson construction. It is one of 480 possible sets of 7 triads (one of two shown in the octonion article) and is the one based on the Cayley–Dickson construction of quaternions from two possible quaternion constructions from the complex numbers. The binary representations of the indices of these triples bitwise XOR to 0. These 35 triads are:

{ {1, 2, 3}, {1, 4, 5}, {1, 7, 6}, {1, 8, 9}, {1, 11, 10}, {1, 13, 12}, {1, 14, 15},
{2, 4, 6}, {2, 5, 7}, {2, 8, 10}, {2, 9, 11}, {2, 14, 12}, {2, 15, 13}, {3, 4, 7},
{3, 6, 5}, {3, 8, 11}, {3, 10, 9}, {3, 13, 14}, {3, 15, 12}, {4, 8, 12}, {4, 9, 13},
{4, 10, 14}, {4, 11, 15}, {5, 8, 13}, {5, 10, 15}, {5, 12, 9}, {5, 14, 11}, {6, 8, 14},
{6, 11, 13}, {6, 12, 10}, {6, 15, 9}, {7, 8, 15}, {7, 9, 14}, {7, 12, 11}, {7, 13, 10} }

=== Zero divisors ===
The list of 84 sets of zero divisors $\{e_a, e_b, e_c, e_d\}$, where $(e_a + e_b) (e_c + e_d) = 0$:
$$\begin{array}{c}
\text{Sedenion zero divisors} \quad \{ e_a, e_b, e_c, e_d \} \\
\text{where} ~ (e_a + e_b) (e_c + e_d) = 0 \\
\begin{array}{ccc}
1 \leq a \leq 6, & c > a, & 9 \leq b \leq 15 \\
\end{array} \\
\\
\begin{array}{lccr}
\{ 9 \leq d \leq 15 \} & \{ -9 \geq d \geq -15 \} &
\{ 9 \leq d \leq 15 \} & \{ -9 \geq d \geq -15 \}\\
\end{array} \\
\\
\begin{array}{lccr}
\{e_1, e_{10}, e_5, e_{14}\} & \{e_1, e_{10}, e_4, -e_{15}\} &
\{e_1, e_{10}, e_7, e_{12}\} & \{e_1, e_{10}, e_6, -e_{13}\} \\
\{e_1, e_{11}, e_4, e_{14}\} & \{e_1, e_{11}, e_6, -e_{12}\} &
\{e_1, e_{11}, e_5, e_{15}\} & \{e_1, e_{11}, e_7, -e_{13}\} \\
\{e_1, e_{12}, e_2, e_{15}\} & \{e_1, e_{12}, e_3, -e_{14}\} &
\{e_1, e_{12}, e_6, e_{11}\} & \{e_1, e_{12}, e_7, -e_{10}\} \\
\{e_1, e_{13}, e_6, e_{10}\} & \{e_1, e_{13}, e_2, -e_{14}\} &
\{e_1, e_{13}, e_7, e_{11}\} & \{e_1, e_{13}, e_3, -e_{15}\} \\
\{e_1, e_{14}, e_2, e_{13}\} & \{e_1, e_{14}, e_4, -e_{11}\} &
\{e_1, e_{14}, e_3, e_{12}\} & \{e_1, e_{14}, e_5, -e_{10}\} \\
\{e_1, e_{15}, e_3, e_{13}\} & \{e_1, e_{15}, e_2, -e_{12}\} &
\{e_1, e_{15}, e_4, e_{10}\} & \{e_1, e_{15}, e_5, -e_{11}\} \\
\\
\{e_2, e_9,    e_4, e_{15}\} & \{e_2, e_9,    e_5, -e_{14}\} &
\{e_2, e_9,    e_6, e_{13}\} & \{e_2, e_9,    e_7, -e_{12}\} \\
\{e_2, e_{11}, e_5, e_{12}\} & \{e_2, e_{11}, e_4, -e_{13}\} &
\{e_2, e_{11}, e_6, e_{15}\} & \{e_2, e_{11}, e_7, -e_{14}\} \\
\{e_2, e_{12}, e_3, e_{13}\} & \{e_2, e_{12}, e_5, -e_{11}\} &
\{e_2, e_{12}, e_7, e_9   \} & \{e_2, e_{13}, e_3, -e_{12}\} \\
\{e_2, e_{13}, e_4, e_{11}\} & \{e_2, e_{13}, e_6, -e_9   \} &
\{e_2, e_{14}, e_5, e_9   \} & \{e_2, e_{14}, e_3, -e_{15}\} \\
\{e_2, e_{14}, e_7, e_{11}\} & \{e_2, e_{15}, e_4, -e_9   \} &
\{e_2, e_{15}, e_3, e_{14}\} & \{e_2, e_{15}, e_6, -e_{11}\} \\
\\
\{e_3, e_9,    e_6, e_{12}\} & \{e_3, e_9,    e_4, -e_{14}\} &
\{e_3, e_9,    e_7, e_{13}\} & \{e_3, e_9,    e_5, -e_{15}\} \\
\{e_3, e_{10}, e_4, e_{13}\} & \{e_3, e_{10}, e_5, -e_{12}\} &
\{e_3, e_{10}, e_7, e_{14}\} & \{e_3, e_{10}, e_6, -e_{15}\} \\
\{e_3, e_{12}, e_5, e_{10}\} & \{e_3, e_{12}, e_6, -e_9   \} &
\{e_3, e_{14}, e_4, e_9   \} & \{e_3, e_{13}, e_4, -e_{10}\} \\
\{e_3, e_{15}, e_5, e_9   \} & \{e_3, e_{13}, e_7, -e_9   \} &
\{e_3, e_{15}, e_6, e_{10}\} & \{e_3, e_{14}, e_7, -e_{10}\} \\
\\
\{e_4, e_9,    e_7, e_{10}\} & \{e_4, e_9,    e_6, -e_{11}\} &
\{e_4, e_{10}, e_5, e_{11}\} & \{e_4, e_{10}, e_7, -e_9   \} \\
\{e_4, e_{11}, e_6, e_9   \} & \{e_4, e_{11}, e_5, -e_{10}\} &
\{e_4, e_{13}, e_6, e_{15}\} & \{e_4, e_{13}, e_7, -e_{14}\} \\
\{e_4, e_{14}, e_7, e_{13}\} & \{e_4, e_{14}, e_5, -e_{15}\} &
\{e_4, e_{15}, e_5, e_{14}\} & \{e_4, e_{15}, e_6, -e_{13}\} \\
\\
\{e_5, e_{10}, e_6, e_9   \} & \{e_5, e_9,    e_6, -e_{10}\} &
\{e_5, e_{11}, e_7, e_9   \} & \{e_5, e_9,    e_7, -e_{11}\} \\
\{e_5, e_{12}, e_7, e_{14}\} & \{e_5, e_{12}, e_6, -e_{15}\} &
\{e_5, e_{15}, e_6, e_{12}\} & \{e_5, e_{14}, e_7, -e_{12}\} \\
\\
\{e_6, e_{11}, e_7, e_{10}\} & \{e_6, e_{10}, e_7, -e_{11}\} &
\{e_6, e_{13}, e_7, e_{12}\} & \{e_6, e_{12}, e_7, -e_{13}\}
\end{array}
\end{array}$$

=== Space of zero divisors ===
It has been shown that the pairs of zero divisors in the unit sedenions form a manifold isomorphic to the Lie group G_{2} in the space $\mathbb{S}^2$.

== Applications ==
Moreno (1998) showed that the space of pairs of norm-one sedenions that multiply to zero is homeomorphic to the compact form of the exceptional Lie group G_{2}. (Note that in his paper, a "zero divisor" means a pair of elements that multiply to zero.)

Guillard & Gresnigt (2019) demonstrated that the three generations of leptons and quarks that are associated with unbroken gauge symmetry $\mathrm {SU(3)_{c} \times U(1)_{em}}$ can be represented using the algebra of the complexified sedenions $\mathbb {C \otimes S}$. A primitive idempotent projector $\rho_{+} = 1/2(1+ie_{15})$ – where $e_{15}$ is chosen as an imaginary unit akin to $e_{7}$ for $\mathbb {O}$ in the Fano plane – that acts on the standard basis of the sedenions uniquely divides the algebra into three sets of split basis elements for $\mathbb {C \otimes O}$, whose adjoint left actions on themselves generate three copies of the Clifford algebra $\mathrm{Cl}(6)$ which in turn contain minimal left ideals that describe a single generation of fermions with unbroken $\mathrm {SU(3)_{c} \times U(1)_{em}}$ gauge symmetry. In particular, they note that tensor products between normed division algebras generate zero divisors akin to those inside $\mathbb {S}$, where for $\mathbb {C \otimes O}$ the lack of alternativity and associativity does not affect the construction of minimal left ideals since their underlying split basis requires only two basis elements to be multiplied together, in-which associativity or alternativity are uninvolved. Still, these ideals constructed from an adjoint algebra of left actions of the algebra on itself remain associative, alternative, and isomorphic to a Clifford algebra. Altogether, this permits three copies of $(\mathbb {C \otimes O})_{L} \cong \mathrm {Cl(6)}$ to exist inside $\mathbb {(C \otimes S)}_{L}$. Furthermore, these three complexified octonion subalgebras are not independent; they share a common $\mathrm{Cl}(2)$ subalgebra, which the authors note could form a theoretical basis for CKM and PMNS matrices that, respectively, describe quark mixing and neutrino oscillations.

Sedenion neural networks provide a means of efficient and compact expression in machine learning applications and have been used in solving multiple time-series and traffic forecasting problems as well as computer chess.

== See also ==
- Pfister's sixteen-square identity
- PG(3,2)
- Split-complex number
