= Gyrovector space =

Mathematical space used to study hyperbolic geometry

A gyrovector space is a mathematical concept proposed by Abraham A. Ungar for studying hyperbolic geometry in analogy to the way vector spaces are used in Euclidean geometry. Ungar introduced the concept of gyrovectors that have addition based on gyrogroups instead of vectors which have addition based on groups. Ungar developed his concept as a tool for the formulation of special relativity as an alternative to the use of Lorentz transformations to represent compositions of velocities (also called boosts – "boosts" are aspects of relative velocities, and should not be conflated with "translations"). This is achieved by introducing "gyro operators"; two 3d velocity vectors are used to construct an operator, which acts on another 3d velocity.

== Name ==
Gyrogroups are weakly associative group-like structures. Ungar proposed the term gyrogroup for what he called a gyrocommutative-gyrogroup, with the term gyrogroup being reserved for the non-gyrocommutative case, in analogy with groups vs. abelian groups. Gyrogroups are a type of Bol loop. Gyrocommutative gyrogroups are equivalent to K-loops although defined differently. The terms Bruck loop and dyadic symset are also in use.

== Mathematics of gyrovector spaces ==
=== Gyrogroups ===
==== Axioms ====
A gyrogroup (G, $\oplus$) consists of an underlying set G and a binary operation $\oplus$ satisfying the following axioms:

1. In G there is at least one element 0 called a left identity with 0 $\oplus$ a = a for all a in G.
2. For each a in G there is an element $\ominus$a in G called a left inverse of a with ($\ominus$a) $\oplus$ a = 0.
3. For any a, b, c in G there exists a unique element gyr[a,b]c in G such that the binary operation obeys the left gyroassociative law: a $\oplus$ (b $\oplus$ c) = (a $\oplus$ b) $\oplus$ gyr[a,b]c
4. The map gyr[a,b]: G → G given by c ↦ gyr[a,b]c is an automorphism of the magma (G, $\oplus$) – that is, gyr[a,b] is a member of Aut(G, $\oplus$) and the automorphism gyr[a,b] of G is called the gyroautomorphism of G generated by a, b in G. The operation gyr: G × G → Aut(G, $\oplus$) is called the gyrator of G.
5. The gyroautomorphism gyr[a,b] has the left loop property gyr[a,b] = gyr[a $\oplus$ b,b]

The first pair of axioms are like the group axioms. The last pair present the gyrator axioms and the middle axiom links the two pairs.

Since a gyrogroup has inverses and an identity it qualifies as a quasigroup and a loop.

Gyrogroups are a generalization of groups. Every group is an example of a gyrogroup with gyr[a,b] defined as the identity map for all a and b in G.

An example of a finite gyrogroup is given in.

==== Identities ====
Some identities which hold in any gyrogroup (G, $\oplus$) are:

1. $\mathrm{gyr}[\mathbf{u},\mathbf{v}]\mathbf{w}=\ominus(\mathbf{u} \oplus \mathbf{v}) \oplus (\mathbf{u} \oplus (\mathbf{v} \oplus \mathbf{w}))$ (gyration)
2. $\mathbf{u} \oplus (\mathbf{v} \oplus \mathbf{w}) = (\mathbf{u} \oplus \mathbf{v})\oplus \mathrm{gyr}[\mathbf{u},\mathbf{v}]\mathbf{w}$ (left associativity)
3. $(\mathbf{u} \oplus \mathbf{v}) \oplus \mathbf{w} = \mathbf{u} \oplus (\mathbf{v}\oplus \mathrm{gyr}[\mathbf{v},\mathbf{u}]\mathbf{w})$ (right associativity)

Furthermore, one may prove the Gyration inversion law, which is the motivation for the definition of gyrocommutativity below:

1. $\ominus (\mathbf{u} \oplus \mathbf{v}) = \mathrm{gyr}[\mathbf{u},\mathbf{v}] (\ominus \mathbf{v} \ominus \mathbf{u})$ (gyration inversion law)

Some additional theorems satisfied by the Gyration group of any gyrogroup include:

1. $\mathrm{gyr}[\mathbf{0},\mathbf{u}] = \mathrm{gyr}[\mathbf{u},\mathbf{u}] = \mathrm{gyr}[\ominus \mathbf{u},\mathbf{u}] = I$ (identity gyrations)
2. $\mathrm{gyr}^{-1}[\mathbf{u},\mathbf{v}] =\mathrm{gyr}[\mathbf{v},\mathbf{u}]$ (gyroautomorphism inversion law)
3. $\mathrm{gyr}[\ominus \mathbf{u},\ominus \mathbf{v}] =\mathrm{gyr}[\mathbf{u},\mathbf{v}]$ (gyration even property)
4. $\mathrm{gyr}[\mathbf{u},\mathbf{v}] =\mathrm{gyr}[\mathbf{u},\mathbf{v} \oplus \mathbf{u}]$ (right loop property)
5. $\mathrm{gyr}[\mathbf{u},\mathbf{v}] =\mathrm{gyr}[\mathbf{u} \oplus \mathbf{v},\mathbf{v}]$ (left loop property)

More identities given on page 50 of. One particularly useful consequence of the above identities is that Gyrogroups satisfy the left Bol property

1. $(\mathbf{u} \oplus (\mathbf{v} \oplus \mathbf{u})) \oplus \mathbf{w} = \mathbf{u} \oplus (\mathbf{v} \oplus (\mathbf{u} \oplus \mathbf{w}))$

==== Gyrocommutativity ====
A gyrogroup (G,$\oplus$) is gyrocommutative if its binary operation obeys the gyrocommutative law: a $\oplus$ b = gyr[a,b](b $\oplus$ a). For relativistic velocity addition, this formula showing the role of rotation relating a + b and b + a was published in 1914 by Ludwik Silberstein.

==== Coaddition ====
In every gyrogroup, a second operation can be defined called coaddition: a $\boxplus$ b = a $\oplus$ gyr[a,$\ominus$b]b for all a, b ∈ G. Coaddition is commutative if the gyrogroup addition is gyrocommutative.

=== Beltrami–Klein disc/ball model and Einstein addition ===
Relativistic velocities can be considered as points in the Beltrami–Klein model of hyperbolic geometry and so vector addition in the Beltrami–Klein model can be given by the velocity addition formula. In order for the formula to generalize to vector addition in hyperbolic space of dimensions greater than 3, the formula must be written in a form that avoids use of the cross product in favour of the dot product.

In the general case, the Einstein velocity addition of two velocities $\mathbf{u}$ and $\mathbf{v}$ is given in coordinate-independent form as:

$$\mathbf{u} \oplus_E \mathbf{v}=\frac{1}{1+\frac{\mathbf{u}\cdot\mathbf{v}}{c^2}}\left\{\mathbf{u}+\frac{1}{\gamma_\mathbf{u}}\mathbf{v}+\frac{1}{c^2}\frac{\gamma_\mathbf{u}}{1+\gamma_\mathbf{u}}(\mathbf{u}\cdot\mathbf{v})\mathbf{u}\right\}$$

where $\gamma_\mathbf{u}$ is the gamma factor given by the equation $\gamma_\mathbf{u}=\frac{1}{\sqrt{1-\frac{|\mathbf{u}|^2}{c^2}}}$.

Using coordinates this becomes:

$$\begin{pmatrix}w_1\\ w_2\\ w_3\\ \end{pmatrix}=\frac{1}{1+\frac{u_1v_1+u_2v_2+u_3v_3}{c^2}}\left\{\left[1+\frac{1}{c^2}\frac{\gamma_\mathbf{u}}{1+\gamma_\mathbf{u}}(u_1v_1+u_2v_2+u_3v_3)\right]\begin{pmatrix}u_1\\ u_2\\ u_3\\ \end{pmatrix}+\frac{1}{\gamma_\mathbf{u}}\begin{pmatrix}v_1\\ v_2\\ v_3\\ \end{pmatrix}\right\}$$

where $\gamma_\mathbf{u}=\frac{1}{\sqrt{1-\frac{u_1^2+u_2^2+u_3^2}{c^2}}}$.

Einstein velocity addition is commutative and associative only when $\mathbf{u}$ and $\mathbf{v}$ are parallel. In fact

$$\mathbf{u} \oplus \mathbf{v}=\mathrm{gyr}[\mathbf{u},\mathbf{v}](\mathbf{v} \oplus \mathbf{u})$$

and

$$\mathbf{u} \oplus (\mathbf{v} \oplus \mathbf{w}) = (\mathbf{u} \oplus \mathbf{v})\oplus \mathrm{gyr}[\mathbf{u},\mathbf{v}]\mathbf{w}$$

where "gyr" is the mathematical abstraction of Thomas precession into an operator called Thomas gyration and given by

$$\mathrm{gyr}[\mathbf{u},\mathbf{v}]\mathbf{w}=\ominus(\mathbf{u} \oplus \mathbf{v}) \oplus (\mathbf{u} \oplus (\mathbf{v} \oplus \mathbf{w}))$$

for all w. Thomas precession has an interpretation in hyperbolic geometry as the negative hyperbolic triangle defect.

==== Lorentz transformation composition ====
If the 3 × 3 matrix form of the rotation applied to 3-coordinates is given by gyr[u,v], then the 4 × 4 matrix rotation applied to 4-coordinates is given by:

$$\mathrm{Gyr}[\mathbf{u},\mathbf{v}]=
\begin{pmatrix}
1 & 0 \\
0 & \mathrm{gyr}[\mathbf{u},\mathbf{v}]
\end{pmatrix}$$.

The composition of two Lorentz boosts B(u) and B(v) of velocities u and v is given by:

$$B(\mathbf{u})B(\mathbf{v})=B(\mathbf{u}\oplus\mathbf{v})\mathrm{Gyr}[\mathbf{u},\mathbf{v}]=\mathrm{Gyr}[\mathbf{u},\mathbf{v}]B(\mathbf{v}\oplus\mathbf{u})$$

This fact that either B(u$\oplus$v) or B(v$\oplus$u) can be used depending whether you write the rotation before or after explains the velocity composition paradox.

The composition of two Lorentz transformations L(u,U) and L(v,V) which include rotations U and V is given by:

$$L(\mathbf{u},U)L(\mathbf{v},V)=L(\mathbf{u}\oplus U\mathbf{v}, \mathrm{gyr}[\mathbf{u},U\mathbf{v}]UV)$$

In the above, a boost can be represented as a 4 × 4 matrix. The boost matrix B(v) means the boost B that uses the components of v, i.e. v_{1}, v_{2}, v_{3} in the entries of the matrix, or rather the components of v/c in the representation that is used in the section Lorentz transformation#Matrix forms. The matrix entries depend on the components of the 3-velocity v, and that's what the notation B(v) means. It could be argued that the entries depend on the components of the 4-velocity because 3 of the entries of the 4-velocity are the same as the entries of the 3-velocity, but the usefulness of parameterizing the boost by 3-velocity is that the resultant boost you get from the composition of two boosts uses the components of the 3-velocity composition u$\oplus$v in the 4 × 4 matrix B(u$\oplus$v). But the resultant boost also needs to be multiplied by a rotation matrix because boost composition (i.e. the multiplication of two 4 × 4 matrices) results not in a pure boost but a boost and a rotation, i.e. a 4 × 4 matrix that corresponds to the rotation Gyr[u,v] to get B(u)B(v) = B(u$\oplus$v)Gyr[u,v] = Gyr[u,v]B(v$\oplus$u).

==== Einstein gyrovector spaces ====
Let s be any positive constant, let (V,+,.) be any real inner product space and let V_{s}={v ∈ V :|v|<s}. An Einstein gyrovector space (V_{s}, $\oplus$, $\otimes$) is an Einstein gyrogroup (V_{s}, $\oplus$) with scalar multiplication given by r$\otimes$v = s tanh(r tanh^{−1}(|v|/s))v/|v| where r is any real number, v ∈ V_{s}, v ≠ 0 and r $\otimes$ 0 = 0 with the notation v $\otimes$ r = r $\otimes$ v.

Einstein scalar multiplication does not distribute over Einstein addition except when the gyrovectors are colinear (monodistributivity), but it has other properties of vector spaces: For any positive integer n and for all real numbers r,r_{1},r_{2} and v ∈ V_{s}:

n $\otimes$ v = v $\oplus$ ... $\oplus$ v	n terms
(r_{1} + r_{2}) $\otimes$ v = r_{1} $\otimes$ v $\oplus$ r_{2} $\otimes$ v	Scalar distributive law
(r_{1}r_{2}) $\otimes$ v = r_{1} $\otimes$ (r_{2} $\otimes$ v)	Scalar associative law
r $\otimes$(r_{1} $\otimes$ a $\oplus$ r_{2} $\otimes$ a) = r $\otimes$(r_{1} $\otimes$ a) $\oplus$ r $\otimes$(r_{2} $\otimes$ a)	Monodistributive law

=== Poincaré disc/ball model and Möbius addition ===
The Möbius transformation of the open unit disc in the complex plane is given by the polar decomposition

$z\to {e^{i\theta}}{\frac{a+z}{1+a\bar{z}}}$ which can be written as $e^{i\theta} {(a\oplus_M {z})}$ which defines the Möbius addition ${a\oplus_M {z}}= \frac{a+z}{1+a\bar{z}}$.

To generalize this to higher dimensions the complex numbers are considered as vectors in the plane $\mathbf{\mathrm{R}}^2$, and Möbius addition is rewritten in vector form as:

$$\mathbf{u} \oplus_M \mathbf{v}=\frac{(1+\frac{2}{s^2}\mathbf{u}\cdot\mathbf{v}+\frac{1}{s^2}|\mathbf{v}|^2)\mathbf{u}+(1-\frac{1}{s^2}|\mathbf{u}|^2)\mathbf{v}}{1+\frac{2}{s^2}\mathbf{u}\cdot\mathbf{v}+\frac{1}{s^4}|\mathbf{u}|^2|\mathbf{v}|^2}$$

This gives the vector addition of points in the Poincaré ball model of hyperbolic geometry where radius s=1 for the complex unit disc now becomes any s>0.

=== Möbius gyrovector spaces ===
Let s be any positive constant, let (V,+,.) be any real inner product space and let V_{s}={v ∈ V :|v|<s}. A Möbius gyrovector space (V_{s}, $\oplus$, $\otimes$) is a Möbius gyrogroup (V_{s}, $\oplus$) with scalar multiplication given by r $\otimes$v = s tanh(r tanh^{−1}(|v|/s))v/|v| where r is any real number, v ∈ V_{s}, v ≠ 0 and r $\otimes$ 0 = 0 with the notation v $\otimes$ r = r $\otimes$ v.

Möbius scalar multiplication coincides with Einstein scalar multiplication (see section above) and this stems from Möbius addition and Einstein addition coinciding for vectors that are parallel.

=== Proper velocity space model and proper velocity addition ===
A proper velocity space model of hyperbolic geometry is given by proper velocities with vector addition given by the proper velocity addition formula:

$$\mathbf{u} \oplus_U \mathbf{v}=\mathbf{u}+\mathbf{v}+\left\{ {\frac{\beta_\mathbf{u}}{1+\beta_\mathbf{u}}}{\frac{\mathbf{u}\cdot\mathbf{v}}{c^2}} + {\frac{1 - \beta_\mathbf{v}}{\beta_\mathbf{v}}} \right\}  \mathbf{u}$$

where $\beta_\mathbf{w}$ is the beta factor given by $\beta_\mathbf{w}=\frac{1}{\sqrt{1+\frac{|\mathbf{w}|^2}{c^2}}}$.

This formula provides a model that uses a whole space compared to other models of hyperbolic geometry which use discs or half-planes.

A proper velocity gyrovector space is a real inner product space V, with the proper velocity gyrogroup addition $\oplus_U$ and with scalar multiplication defined by r $\otimes$v = s sinh(r sinh^{−1}(|v|/s))v/|v| where r is any real number, v ∈ V, v ≠ 0 and r $\otimes$ 0 = 0 with the notation v $\otimes$ r = r $\otimes$ v.

=== Isomorphisms ===
A gyrovector space isomorphism preserves gyrogroup addition and scalar multiplication and the inner product.

The three gyrovector spaces Möbius, Einstein and Proper Velocity are isomorphic.

If M, E and U are Möbius, Einstein and Proper Velocity gyrovector spaces respectively with elements v_{m}, v_{e} and v_{u} then the isomorphisms are given by:

E$\rightarrow$U by $\gamma_{\mathbf{v}_e} \mathbf{v}_e$
U$\rightarrow$E by $\beta_{\mathbf{v}_u} \mathbf{v}_u$
E$\rightarrow$M by $\frac{1}{2} \otimes_E \mathbf{v}_e$
M$\rightarrow$E by $2 \otimes_M \mathbf{v}_m$
M$\rightarrow$U by $2 {{{\gamma}^{2}}_{\mathbf{v}_m}} \mathbf{v}_m$
U$\rightarrow$M by $\frac{\beta_{\mathbf{v}_u}}{1+\beta_{\mathbf{v}_u}}\mathbf{v}_u$

From this table the relation between $\oplus_E$ and $\oplus_M$ is given by the equations:

$\mathbf{u}\oplus_E\mathbf{v}=2\otimes\left({\frac{1}{2}\otimes\mathbf{u}\oplus_M\frac{1}{2}\otimes\mathbf{v}}\right)$

$\mathbf{u}\oplus_M\mathbf{v}=\frac{1}{2}\otimes\left({2\otimes\mathbf{u}\oplus_E 2\otimes\mathbf{v}}\right)$

This is related to the connection between Möbius transformations and Lorentz transformations.

=== Gyrotrigonometry ===
Gyrotrigonometry is the use of gyroconcepts to study hyperbolic triangles.

Hyperbolic trigonometry as usually studied uses the hyperbolic functions cosh, sinh etc., and this contrasts with spherical trigonometry which uses the Euclidean trigonometric functions cos, sin, but with spherical triangle identities instead of ordinary plane triangle identities. Gyrotrigonometry takes the approach of using the ordinary trigonometric functions but in conjunction with gyrotriangle identities.

==== Triangle centers ====
The study of triangle centers traditionally is concerned with Euclidean geometry, but triangle centers can also be studied in hyperbolic geometry. Using gyrotrigonometry, expressions for trigonometric barycentric coordinates can be calculated that have the same form for both euclidean and hyperbolic geometry. In order for the expressions to coincide, the expressions must not encapsulate the specification of the anglesum being 180 degrees.

==== Gyroparallelogram addition ====
Using gyrotrigonometry, a gyrovector addition can be found which operates according to the gyroparallelogram law. This is the coaddition to the gyrogroup operation. Gyroparallelogram addition is commutative.

The gyroparallelogram law is similar to the parallelogram law in that a gyroparallelogram is a hyperbolic quadrilateral the two gyrodiagonals of which intersect at their gyromidpoints, just as a parallelogram is a Euclidean quadrilateral the two diagonals of which intersect at their midpoints.

=== Bloch vectors ===
Bloch vectors which belong to the open unit ball of the Euclidean 3-space, can be studied with Einstein addition or Möbius addition.

== Book reviews ==
A review of one of the earlier gyrovector books says the following:

"Over the years, there have been a handful of attempts to promote the non-Euclidean style for use in problem solving in relativity and electrodynamics, the failure of which to attract any substantial following, compounded by the absence of any positive results must give pause to anyone considering a similar undertaking. Until recently, no one was in a position to offer an improvement on the tools available since 1912. In his new book, Ungar furnishes the crucial missing element from the panoply of the non-Euclidean style: an elegant nonassociative algebraic formalism that fully exploits the structure of Einstein’s law of velocity composition."

== Notes and references ==
- Domenico Giulini, Algebraic and geometric structures of Special Relativity, A Chapter in "Special Relativity: Will it Survive the Next 100 Years?", edited by Claus Lämmerzahl, Jürgen Ehlers, Springer, 2006.
