= Alternative algebra =

Algebra where x(xy)=(xx)y and (yx)x=y(xx)

In abstract algebra, an alternative algebra is an algebra in which multiplication need not be associative, only alternative. That is, one must have

- $x(xy) = (xx)y$
- $(yx)x = y(xx)$

for all x and y in the algebra.

Every associative algebra is alternative, given that alternativity is simply a weak form of associativity. However, so too are some strictly non-associative algebras such as the octonions.

== The associator ==
Alternative algebras are so named because they are the algebras for which the associator is alternating. The associator is a trilinear map given by

$$[x,y,z] = (xy)z - x(yz)$$.

By definition, a multilinear map is alternating if it vanishes whenever two of its arguments are equal. The left and right alternative identities for an algebra are equivalent to

$$[x,x,y] = 0$$
$$[y,x,x] = 0$$

Both of these identities together imply that:

$$[x,y,x]=[x,x,x]+[x,y,x]+$$
$$-[x,x+y,x+y] =$$
$$= [x,x+y,-y] =$$
$$= [x,x,-y] - [x,y,y] = 0$$

for all $x$ and $y$. This is equivalent to the flexible identity

$$(xy)x = x(yx).$$

The associator of an alternative algebra is therefore alternating. Conversely, any algebra whose associator is alternating is clearly alternative. By symmetry, any algebra which satisfies any two of:

- left alternative identity: $x(xy) = (xx)y$
- right alternative identity: $(yx)x = y(xx)$
- flexible identity: $(xy)x = x(yx).$

is alternative and therefore satisfies all three identities.

An alternating associator is always totally skew-symmetric. That is,

$$[x_{\sigma(1)}, x_{\sigma(2)}, x_{\sigma(3)}] = \sgn(\sigma)[x_1,x_2,x_3]$$

for any permutation $\sigma$. The converse holds so long as the characteristic of the base field is not 2.

== Examples ==
- Every associative algebra is alternative.
- The octonions form a non-associative alternative algebra, a normed division algebra of dimension 8 over the real numbers.
- More generally, any octonion algebra is alternative.

=== Non-examples ===
- The sedenions, trigintaduonions, and all higher Cayley–Dickson algebras lose alternativity. Lie algebras are usually not alternative.

== Properties ==
Artin's theorem states that in an alternative algebra the subalgebra generated by any two elements is associative. Conversely, any algebra for which this is true is clearly alternative. It follows that expressions involving only two variables can be written unambiguously without parentheses in an alternative algebra. A generalization of Artin's theorem states that whenever three elements $x,y,z$ in an alternative algebra associate (i.e., $[x,y,z] = 0$), the subalgebra generated by those elements is associative.

A corollary of Artin's theorem is that alternative algebras are power-associative, that is, the subalgebra generated by a single element is associative. The converse need not hold: the sedenions are power-associative but not alternative.

The Moufang identities

- $a(x(ay)) = (axa)y$
- $((xa)y)a = x(aya)$
- $(ax)(ya) = a(xy)a$

hold in any alternative algebra.

In a unital alternative algebra, multiplicative inverses are unique whenever they exist. Moreover, for any invertible element $x$ and all $y$ one has

$$y = x^{-1}(xy).$$

This is equivalent to saying the associator $[x^{-1},x,y]$ vanishes for all such $x$ and $y$.

If $x$ and $y$ are invertible then $xy$ is also invertible with inverse $(xy)^{-1} = y^{-1}x^{-1}$. The set of all invertible elements is therefore closed under multiplication and forms a Moufang loop. This loop of units in an alternative ring or algebra is analogous to the group of units in an associative ring or algebra.

Kleinfeld's theorem states that any simple non-associative alternative ring is a generalized octonion algebra over its center. The structure theory of alternative rings is presented in the book Rings That Are Nearly Associative by Zhevlakov, Slin'ko, Shestakov, and Shirshov.

Every finite alternative division ring is a finite field by the Artin–Zorn theorem.

== Occurrence ==
The projective plane over any alternative division ring is a Moufang plane.

Every composition algebra is an alternative algebra.

== See also ==
- Algebra over a field
- Maltsev algebra
- Zorn ring

== Sources ==
- Schafer, Richard D. (1995). An Introduction to Nonassociative Algebras. New York: Dover Publications. ISBN 0-486-68813-5. Zbl 0145.25601.
- Zhevlakov, K.A.; Slin'ko, A.M.; Shestakov, I.P.; Shirshov, A.I. (1982) [1978]. Rings That Are Nearly Associative. Academic Press. ISBN 0-12-779850-1. MR 0518614. Zbl 0487.17001.
