= Power associativity =

Property of a binary operation

In mathematics, specifically in abstract algebra, power associativity is the property of a binary operation that integer powers ($x^n$) are well-defined; it implies that $x^m * x^n = x^{m+n}$ for all positive integers $m, n$. It is a weak form of associativity.

== Definition ==
An algebra (or more generally a magma) is power-associative if the subalgebra generated by any element is associative. So any product of $n$ instances of an element $x$ has the same value, denoted $x^n$, regardless of parenthesization. For example, $x*(x*(x*x))=\,$$x*((x*x)*x)=\,$$(x*x)*(x*x)=\,$$(x*(x*x))*x=\,$$((x*x)*x)*x=\,$$(x*x)^2 =\,$$x^4$.

== Examples and properties ==
Every associative algebra is power-associative, but so are all other alternative algebras (like the octonions, which are non-associative) and even non-alternative flexible algebras like the sedenions, trigintaduonions, and Okubo algebras. Any Jordan algebra is power-associative. Any algebra whose elements are idempotent is also power-associative.

Exponentiation to the power of any positive integer can be defined consistently whenever multiplication is power-associative. For example, there is no need to distinguish whether x^{3} should be defined as (xx)x or as x(xx), since these are equal. Exponentiation to the power of zero can also be defined if the operation has an identity element, so the existence of identity elements is useful in power-associative contexts.

Over a field of characteristic 0, an algebra is power-associative if and only if it satisfies $[x,x,x]=0$ and $[x^2,x,x]=0$, where $[x,y,z]:=(xy)z-x(yz)$ is the associator (Albert 1948).

Over an infinite field of prime characteristic $p>0$ there is no finite set of identities that characterizes power-associativity, but there are infinite independent sets, as described by Gainov (1970):

- For $p=2$: $[x,x^2,x]=0$ and $[x^{n-2},x,x]=0$ for $n=3,2^k$ ($k=2,3...)$
- For $p=3$: $[x^{n-2},x,x]=0$ for $n=4,5,3^k$ ($k=1,2...)$
- For $p=5$: $[x^{n-2},x,x]=0$ for $n=3,4,6,5^k$ ($k=1,2...)$
- For $p>5$: $[x^{n-2},x,x]=0$ for $n=3,4,p^k$ ($k=1,2...)$

A substitution law holds for real power-associative algebras with unit, which basically asserts that multiplication of polynomials works as expected. For f a real polynomial in x, and for any a in such an algebra define f(a) to be the element of the algebra resulting from the obvious substitution of a into f. Then for any two such polynomials f and g, we have that (fg)(a) = f(a)g(a).

== See also ==
- Alternativity
