= E7 (mathematics) =

133-dimensional exceptional simple Lie group

In mathematics, E_{7} is the name of several closely related Lie groups, linear algebraic groups or their Lie algebras e_{7}, all of which have dimension 133; the same notation E_{7} is used for the corresponding root lattice, which has rank 7. The designation E_{7} comes from the Cartan–Killing classification of the complex simple Lie algebras, which fall into four infinite series labeled A_{n}, B_{n}, C_{n}, D_{n}, and five exceptional cases labeled E_{6}, E_{7}, E_{8}, F_{4}, and G_{2}. The E_{7} algebra is thus one of the five exceptional cases.

The fundamental group of the (adjoint) complex form, compact real form, or any algebraic version of E_{7} is the cyclic group Z/2Z, and its outer automorphism group is the trivial group. The dimension of its fundamental representation is 56.

== Real and complex forms ==
There is a unique complex Lie algebra of type E_{7}, corresponding to a complex group of complex dimension 133. The complex adjoint Lie group E_{7} of complex dimension 133 can be considered as a simple real Lie group of real dimension 266. This has fundamental group Z/2Z, has maximal compact subgroup the compact form (see below) of E_{7}, and has an outer automorphism group of order 2 generated by complex conjugation.

As well as the complex Lie group of type E_{7}, there are four real forms of the Lie algebra, and correspondingly four real forms of the group with trivial center (all of which have an algebraic double cover, and three of which have further non-algebraic covers, giving further real forms), all of real dimension 133, as follows:

- The compact form (which is usually the one meant if no other information is given), which has fundamental group Z/2Z and has trivial outer automorphism group.
- The split form, EV (or E_{7(7)}), which has maximal compact subgroup SU(8)/{±1}, fundamental group cyclic of order 4 and outer automorphism group of order 2.
- EVI (or E_{7(-5)}), which has maximal compact subgroup SU(2)·SO(12)/(center), fundamental group non-cyclic of order 4 and trivial outer automorphism group.
- EVII (or E_{7(-25)}), which has maximal compact subgroup SO(2)·E_{6}/(center), infinite cyclic fundamental group and outer automorphism group of order 2.

For a complete list of real forms of simple Lie algebras, see the list of simple Lie groups.

The compact real form of E_{7} is the isometry group of the 64-dimensional exceptional compact Riemannian symmetric space EVI (in Cartan's classification). It is known informally as the "quateroctonionic projective plane" because it can be built using an algebra that is the tensor product of the quaternions and the octonions, and is also known as a Rosenfeld projective plane, though it does not obey the usual axioms of a projective plane. This can be seen systematically using a construction known as the magic square, due to Hans Freudenthal and Jacques Tits.

The algebraic double cover of the complex form, or of the split real form, or of EVII can be described as the automorphism group of a Freudenthal triple system, which is a special kind of triple system defined on a 56-dimensional vector space.

The Tits–Koecher construction produces forms of the E_{7} Lie algebra from Albert algebras, 27-dimensional exceptional Jordan algebras.

== E_{7} as an algebraic group ==
By means of a Chevalley basis for the Lie algebra, one can define E_{7} as a linear algebraic group over the integers and, consequently, over any commutative ring and in particular over any field: this defines the so-called split (sometimes also known as "untwisted") adjoint form of E_{7}. Over an algebraically closed field, this and its double cover are the only forms; however, over other fields, there are often many other forms, or "twists" of E_{7}, which are classified in the general framework of Galois cohomology (over a perfect field k) by the set H^{1}(k, Aut(E_{7})) which, because the Dynkin diagram of E_{7} (see below) has no automorphisms, coincides with H^{1}(k, E_{7, ad}).

Over the field of real numbers, the real component of the identity of these algebraically twisted forms of E_{7} coincide with the three real Lie groups mentioned above, but with a subtlety concerning the fundamental group: all adjoint forms of E_{7} have fundamental group Z/2Z in the sense of algebraic geometry, meaning that they admit exactly one double cover; the further non-compact real Lie group forms of E_{7} are therefore not algebraic and admit no faithful finite-dimensional representations.

Over finite fields, the Lang–Steinberg theorem implies that H^{1}(k, E_{7}) = 0, meaning that E_{7} has no twisted forms: see below.

== Algebra ==
=== Dynkin diagram ===
The Dynkin diagram for E_{7} is given by .

=== Root system ===
The 126 vertices of the 2_{31} polytope represent the root vectors of E_{7}, as shown in this Coxeter plane projection Coxeter–Dynkin diagram:

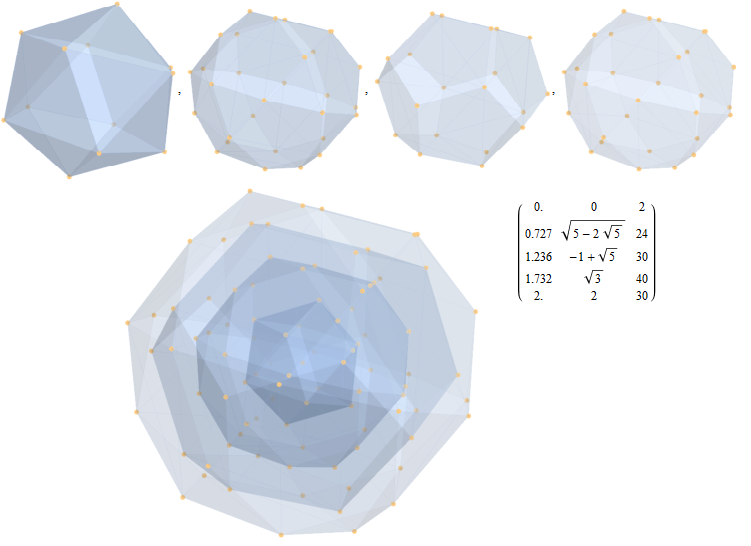
Shown in 3D projection using the basis vectors [u,v,w] giving H3 symmetry: u = (1, φ, 0, -1, φ, 0,0) v = (φ, 0, 1, φ, 0, -1,0) w = (0, 1, φ, 0, -1, φ,0) The projected 2_{31} polytope vertices are sorted and tallied by their 3D norm generating the increasingly transparent hulls of each set of tallied norms. These show: 1) 2 points at the origin 2) 2 icosahedrons 3) 1 icosadodecahedron 4) 2 dodecahedrons 5) 1 icosadodecahedron for a total of 126 vertices.

Even though the roots span a 7-dimensional space, it is more symmetric and convenient to represent them as vectors lying in a 7-dimensional subspace of an 8-dimensional vector space.

The roots are all the 8×7 permutations of (1,−1,0,0,0,0,0,0) and all the
$$\begin{pmatrix}8\\4\end{pmatrix}$$
permutations of (1/2,1/2,1/2,1/2,−1/2,−1/2,−1/2,−1/2)

Note that the 7-dimensional subspace is the subspace where the sum of all the eight coordinates is zero. There are 126 roots.

The simple roots are

(0,−1,1,0,0,0,0,0)
(0,0,−1,1,0,0,0,0)
(0,0,0,−1,1,0,0,0)
(0,0,0,0,−1,1,0,0)
(0,0,0,0,0,−1,1,0)
(0,0,0,0,0,0,−1,1)
(1/2,1/2,1/2,1/2,−1/2,−1/2,−1/2,−1/2)

They are listed so that their corresponding nodes in the Dynkin diagram are ordered from left to right (in the diagram depicted above) with the side node last.

==== An alternative description ====
An alternative (7-dimensional) description of the root system, which is useful in considering E_{7} × SU(2) as a subgroup of E_{8}, is the following:

All
$$4\times\begin{pmatrix}6\\2\end{pmatrix}$$
permutations of (±1,±1,0,0,0,0,0) preserving the zero at the last entry, all of the following roots with an even number of +1/2

$$\left(\pm{1\over 2},\pm{1\over 2},\pm{1\over 2},\pm{1\over 2},\pm{1\over 2},\pm{1\over 2},\pm{1\over \sqrt{2}}\right)$$

and the two following roots

$$\left(0,0,0,0,0,0,\pm \sqrt{2}\right).$$

Thus the generators consist of a 66-dimensional so(12) subalgebra as well as 64 generators that transform as two self-conjugate Weyl spinors of spin(12) of opposite chirality, and their chirality generator, and two other generators of chiralities $\pm \sqrt{2}$.

Given the E_{7} Cartan matrix (below) and a Dynkin diagram node ordering of:

one choice of simple roots is given by the rows of the following matrix:
$$\begin{bmatrix}
1&-1&0&0&0&0&0 \\
0&1&-1&0&0&0&0 \\
0&0&1&-1&0&0&0 \\
0&0&0&1&-1&0&0 \\
0&0&0&0&1&1&0 \\
-\frac{1}{2}&-\frac{1}{2}&-\frac{1}{2}&-\frac{1}{2}&-\frac{1}{2}&-\frac{1}{2}&\frac{\sqrt{2}}{2}\\
0&0&0&0&1&-1&0 \\
\end{bmatrix}.$$

Hasse diagram of E_{7} root poset with edge labels identifying added simple root position

=== Weyl group ===
The Weyl group of E_{7} is of order 2903040: it is the direct product of the cyclic group of order 2 and the unique simple group of order 1451520 (which can be described as PSp_{6}(2) or PSΩ_{7}(2)).

=== Cartan matrix ===
$$\begin{bmatrix}
2 & -1 & 0 & 0 & 0 & 0 & 0 \\
-1 & 2 & -1 & 0 & 0 & 0 & 0 \\
0 & -1 & 2 & -1 & 0 & 0 & 0 \\
0 & 0 & -1 & 2 & -1 & 0 & -1 \\
0 & 0 & 0 & -1 & 2 & -1 & 0 \\
0 & 0 & 0 & 0 & -1 & 2 & 0 \\
0 & 0 & 0 & -1 & 0 & 0 & 2
\end{bmatrix}.$$

== Important subalgebras and representations ==
Embeddings of the maximal subgroups of E_{7} up to dimension 133 shown with associated projection matrix.

E_{7} has an SU(8) subalgebra, as is evident by noting that in the 8-dimensional description of the root system, the first group of roots are identical to the roots of SU(8) (with the same Cartan subalgebra as in the E_{7}).

In addition to the 133-dimensional adjoint representation, there is a 56-dimensional "vector" representation, to be found in the E_{8} adjoint representation.

The characters of finite dimensional representations of the real and complex Lie algebras and Lie groups are all given by the Weyl character formula. The dimensions of the smallest irreducible representations are (sequence A121736 in the OEIS):

1, 56, 133, 912, 1463, 1539, 6480, 7371, 8645, 24320, 27664, 40755, 51072, 86184, 150822, 152152, 238602, 253935, 293930, 320112, 362880, 365750, 573440, 617253, 861840, 885248, 915705, 980343, 2273920, 2282280, 2785552, 3424256, 3635840...

The underlined terms in the sequence above are the dimensions of those irreducible representations possessed by the adjoint form of E_{7} (equivalently, those whose weights belong to the root lattice of E_{7}), whereas the full sequence gives the dimensions of the irreducible representations of the simply connected form of E_{7}. There exist non-isomorphic irreducible representation of dimensions 1903725824, 16349520330, etc.

The fundamental representations are those with dimensions 133, 8645, 365750, 27664, 1539, 56 and 912 (corresponding to the seven nodes in the Dynkin diagram in the order chosen for the Cartan matrix above, i.e., the nodes are read in the six-node chain first, with the last node being connected to the third).

The embeddings of the maximal subgroups of E_{7} up to dimension 133 are shown to the right.

=== E_{7} Polynomial Invariants ===
E_{7} is the automorphism group of the following pair of polynomials in 56 non-commutative variables. We divide the variables into two groups of 28, (p, P) and (q, Q) where p and q are real variables and P and Q are 3×3 octonion hermitian matrices. Then the first invariant is the symplectic invariant of Sp(56, R):

$$C_1 = pq - qp + Tr[PQ] - Tr[QP]$$

The second more complicated invariant is a symmetric quartic polynomial:

$$C_2 = (pq + Tr[P\circ Q])^2 + p Tr[Q\circ \tilde{Q}]+q Tr[P\circ \tilde{P}]+Tr[\tilde{P}\circ \tilde{Q}]$$

Where $\tilde{P} \equiv \det(P) P^{-1}$ and the binary circle operator is defined by $A\circ B = (AB+BA)/2$.

An alternative quartic polynomial invariant constructed by Cartan uses two anti-symmetric 8x8 matrices each with 28 components.

$$C_2 = Tr[(XY)^2] - \dfrac{1}{4} Tr[XY]^2 +\frac{1}{96}\epsilon_{ijklmnop}\left( X^{ij}X^{kl}X^{mn}X^{op} + Y^{ij}Y^{kl}Y^{mn}Y^{op} \right)$$

== Chevalley groups of type E_{7} ==
The points over a finite field with q elements of the (split) algebraic group E_{7} (see above), whether of the adjoint (centerless) or simply connected form (its algebraic universal cover), give a finite Chevalley group. This is closely connected to the group written E_{7}(q), however there is ambiguity in this notation, which can stand for several things:

- the finite group consisting of the points over F_{q} of the simply connected form of E_{7} (for clarity, this can be written E_{7,sc}(q) and is known as the "universal" Chevalley group of type E_{7} over F_{q}),
- (rarely) the finite group consisting of the points over F_{q} of the adjoint form of E_{7} (for clarity, this can be written E_{7,ad}(q), and is known as the "adjoint" Chevalley group of type E_{7} over F_{q}), or
- the finite group which is the image of the natural map from the former to the latter: this is what will be denoted by E_{7}(q) in the following, as is most common in texts dealing with finite groups.

From the finite group perspective, the relation between these three groups, which is quite analogous to that between SL(n, q), PGL(n, q) and PSL(n, q), can be summarized as follows: E_{7}(q) is simple for any q, E_{7,sc}(q) is its Schur cover, and the E_{7,ad}(q) lies in its automorphism group; furthermore, when q is a power of 2, all three coincide, and otherwise (when q is odd), the Schur multiplier of E_{7}(q) is 2 and E_{7}(q) is of index 2 in E_{7,ad}(q), which explains why E_{7,sc}(q) and E_{7,ad}(q) are often written as 2·E_{7}(q) and E_{7}(q)·2. From the algebraic group perspective, it is less common for E_{7}(q) to refer to the finite simple group, because the latter is not in a natural way the set of points of an algebraic group over F_{q} unlike E_{7,sc}(q) and E_{7,ad}(q).

As mentioned above, E_{7}(q) is simple for any q, and it constitutes one of the infinite families addressed by the classification of finite simple groups. Its number of elements is given by the formula (sequence A008870 in the OEIS):

$$\frac{1}{\mathrm{gcd}(2,q-1)}q^{63}(q^{18}-1)(q^{14}-1)(q^{12}-1)(q^{10}-1)(q^8-1)(q^6-1)(q^2-1)$$

The order of E_{7,sc}(q) or E_{7,ad}(q) (both are equal) can be obtained by removing the dividing factor gcd(2, q−1) (sequence A008869 in the OEIS). The Schur multiplier of E_{7}(q) is gcd(2, q−1), and its outer automorphism group is the product of the diagonal automorphism group Z/gcd(2, q−1)Z (given by the action of E_{7,ad}(q)) and the group of field automorphisms (i.e., cyclic of order f if q = p^{f} where p is prime).

== Importance in physics ==
N = 8 supergravity in four dimensions, which is a dimensional reduction from eleven-dimensional supergravity, admit an E_{7} bosonic global symmetry and an SU(8) bosonic local symmetry. The fermions are in representations of SU(8), the gauge fields are in a representation of E_{7}, and the scalars are in a representation of both (Gravitons are singlets with respect to both). Physical states are in representations of the coset E_{7} / SU(8).

In string theory, E_{7} appears as a part of the gauge group of one of the (unstable and non-supersymmetric) versions of the heterotic string. It can also appear in the unbroken gauge group E_{8} × E_{7} in six-dimensional compactifications of heterotic string theory, for instance on the four-dimensional surface K3.

== See also ==
- En (Lie algebra)
- ADE classification
- List of simple Lie groups
