= Steinberg group =

In mathematics, Steinberg group means either of two distinct, though related, constructions of the mathematician Robert Steinberg:

- Steinberg group (K-theory) St(A) in algebraic K-theory.
- Steinberg group (Lie theory) is a 'twisted' group of Lie type, in particular one of the groups of type ^{3}D_{4} or ^{2}E_{6}.
