= Freudenthal magic square =

Relation between Lie algebras depicted as a square

A \ B	$\mathbb R$	$\mathbb C$	$\mathbb H$	$\mathbb O$
$\mathbb R$	A_{1}	A_{2}	C_{3}	F_{4}
$\mathbb C$	A_{2}	A_{2} × A_{2}	A_{5}	E_{6}
$\mathbb H$	C_{3}	A_{5}	D_{6}	E_{7}
$\mathbb O$	F_{4}	E_{6}	E_{7}	E_{8}

In mathematics, the Freudenthal magic square (or Freudenthal–Tits magic square) is a construction relating several Lie algebras (and their associated Lie groups). It is named after Hans Freudenthal and Jacques Tits, who developed the idea independently. It associates a Lie algebra to a pair of division algebras A, B. The resulting Lie algebras have Dynkin diagrams according to the table at the right. The "magic" of the Freudenthal magic square is that the constructed Lie algebra is symmetric in A and B, despite the original construction not being symmetric, though Vinberg's symmetric method gives a symmetric construction.

The Freudenthal magic square includes all of the exceptional Lie groups apart from G_{2}, and it provides one possible approach to justify the assertion that "the exceptional Lie groups all exist because of the octonions": G_{2} itself is the automorphism group of the octonions (also, it is in many ways like a classical Lie group because it is the stabilizer of a generic 3-form on a 7-dimensional vector space – see prehomogeneous vector space).

== Constructions ==
See history for context and motivation. These were originally constructed circa 1958 by Freudenthal and Tits, with more elegant formulations following in later years.

=== Tits' approach ===
Tits' approach, discovered circa 1958 and published in (Tits 1966), is as follows.

Associated with any normed real division algebra A (i.e., R, C, H or O) there is a Jordan algebra, J_{3}(A), of 3 × 3 A-Hermitian matrices. For any pair (A, B) of such division algebras, one can define a Lie algebra

$$L=\left (\mathfrak{der}(A)\oplus\mathfrak{der}(J_3(B))\right )\oplus \left (A_0\otimes J_3(B)_0 \right )$$

where $\mathfrak{der}$ denotes the Lie algebra of derivations of an algebra, and the subscript 0 denotes the trace-free part. The Lie algebra L has $\mathfrak{der}(A)\oplus\mathfrak{der}(J_3(B))$ as a subalgebra, and this acts naturally on $A_0\otimes J_3(B)_0$. The Lie bracket on $A_0\otimes J_3(B)_0$ (which is not a subalgebra) is not obvious, but Tits showed how it could be defined, and that it produced the following table of compact Lie algebras.

	B	R	C	H	O
A	der(A/B)	0	0	$\mathfrak{sp}_1$	$\mathfrak{g}_2$
R	0	$\mathfrak{so}_3$	$\mathfrak{su}_3$	$\mathfrak{sp}_3$	$\mathfrak{f}_4$
C	0	$\mathfrak{su}_3$	$\mathfrak{su}_3\oplus\mathfrak{su}_3$	$\mathfrak{su}_6$	$\mathfrak{e}_6$
H	$\mathfrak{sp}_1$	$\mathfrak{sp}_3$	$\mathfrak{su}_6$	$\mathfrak{so}_{12}$	$\mathfrak{e}_7$
O	$\mathfrak{g}_2$	$\mathfrak{f}_4$	$\mathfrak{e}_6$	$\mathfrak{e}_7$	$\mathfrak{e}_8$

By construction, the row of the table with A=R gives $\mathfrak{der}(J_3(B))$, and similarly vice versa.

=== Vinberg's symmetric method ===
The "magic" of the Freudenthal magic square is that the constructed Lie algebra is symmetric in A and B. This is not obvious from Tits' construction. Ernest Vinberg gave a construction which is manifestly symmetric, in (Vinberg 1966). Instead of using a Jordan algebra, he uses an algebra of skew-hermitian trace-free matrices with entries in A ⊗ B, denoted $\mathfrak{sa}_3(A\otimes B)$. Vinberg defines a Lie algebra structure on

$$\mathfrak{der}(A)\oplus\mathfrak{der}(B)\oplus\mathfrak{sa}_3(A\otimes B).$$

When A and B have no derivations (i.e., R or C), this is just the Lie (commutator) bracket on $\mathfrak{sa}_3(A\otimes B)$. In the presence of derivations, these form a subalgebra acting naturally on $\mathfrak{sa}_3(A\otimes B)$ as in Tits' construction, and the tracefree commutator bracket on $\mathfrak{sa}_3(A\otimes B)$ is modified by an expression with values in $\mathfrak{der}(A)\oplus\mathfrak{der}(B)$.

=== Triality ===
A more recent construction, due to Pierre Ramond (Ramond 1976) and Bruce Allison (Allison 1978) and developed by Chris Barton and Anthony Sudbery, uses triality in the form developed by John Frank Adams; this was presented in (Barton & Sudbery 2000), and in streamlined form in (Barton & Sudbery 2003). Whereas Vinberg's construction is based on the automorphism groups of a division algebra A (or rather their Lie algebras of derivations), Barton and Sudbery use the group of automorphisms of the corresponding triality. The triality is the trilinear map

$$A_1\times A_2\times A_3 \to \mathbf R$$

obtained by taking three copies of the division algebra A, and using the inner product on A to dualize the multiplication. The automorphism group is the subgroup of SO(A_{1}) × SO(A_{2}) × SO(A_{3}) preserving this trilinear map. It is denoted Tri(A). The following table compares its Lie algebra to the Lie algebra of derivations.

A:	R	C	H	O
$\mathfrak{der}(A)$	0	0	$\mathfrak{sp}_1$	$\mathfrak{g}_2$
$\mathfrak{tri}(A)$	0	$\mathfrak u_1 \oplus \mathfrak u_1$	$\mathfrak{sp}_1 \oplus \mathfrak{sp}_1\oplus \mathfrak{sp}_1$	$\mathfrak{so}_8$

Barton and Sudbery then identify the magic square Lie algebra corresponding to (A,B) with a Lie algebra structure on the vector space

$$\mathfrak{tri}(A)\oplus\mathfrak{tri}(B)\oplus (A_1\otimes B_1)\oplus (A_2\otimes B_2)\oplus (A_3\otimes B_3).$$

The Lie bracket is compatible with a Z_{2} × Z_{2} grading, with tri(A) and tri(B) in degree (0,0), and the three copies of A ⊗ B in degrees (0,1), (1,0) and (1,1). The bracket preserves tri(A) and tri(B) and these act naturally on the three copies of A ⊗ B, as in the other constructions, but the brackets between these three copies are more constrained.

For instance when A and B are the octonions, the triality is that of Spin(8), the double cover of SO(8), and the Barton-Sudbery description yields

$$\mathfrak e_8\cong \mathfrak{so}_8\oplus\widehat{\mathfrak{so}}_8\oplus(V\otimes \widehat V)\oplus (S_+\otimes\widehat S_+)\oplus (S_-\otimes \widehat S_-)$$

where V, S_{+} and S_{−} are the three 8-dimensional representations of $\mathfrak{so}_8$ (the fundamental representation and the two spin representations), and the hatted objects are an isomorphic copy.

With respect to one of the Z_{2} gradings, the first three summands combine to give $\mathfrak{so}_{16}$ and the last two together form one of its spin representations Δ_{+}^{128} (the superscript denotes the dimension). This is a well known symmetric decomposition of E8.

The Barton–Sudbery construction extends this to the other Lie algebras in the magic square. In particular, for the exceptional Lie algebras in the last row (or column), the symmetric decompositions are:

$$\mathfrak f_4\cong \mathfrak{so}_9\oplus \Delta^{16}$$
$$\mathfrak e_6\cong (\mathfrak{so}_{10}\oplus \mathfrak u_1)\oplus \Delta^{32}$$
$$\mathfrak e_7\cong (\mathfrak{so}_{12}\oplus \mathfrak{sp}_1)\oplus \Delta_+^{64}$$
$$\mathfrak e_8\cong \mathfrak{so}_{16}\oplus \Delta_+^{128}.$$

== Generalizations ==
=== Split composition algebras ===
In addition to the normed division algebras, there are other composition algebras over R, namely the split-complex numbers, the split-quaternions and the split-octonions. If one uses these instead of the complex numbers, quaternions, and octonions, one obtains the following variant of the magic square (where the split versions of the division algebras are denoted by a prime).

A\B	R	C'	H'	O'
R	$\mathfrak{so}_3$	$\mathfrak{sl}_3(\mathbf R)$	$\mathfrak{sp}_6(\mathbf R)$	$\mathfrak{f}_{4(4)}$
C'	$\mathfrak{sl}_3(\mathbf R)$	$\mathfrak{sl}_3(\mathbf R)\oplus\mathfrak{sl}_3(\mathbf R)$	$\mathfrak{sl}_6(\mathbf R)$	$\mathfrak{e}_{6(6)}$
H'	$\mathfrak{sp}_6(\mathbf R)$	$\mathfrak{sl}_6(\mathbf R)$	$\mathfrak{so}_{6,6}$	$\mathfrak{e}_{7(7)}$
O'	$\mathfrak{f}_{4(4)}$	$\mathfrak{e}_{6(6)}$	$\mathfrak{e}_{7(7)}$	$\mathfrak{e}_{8(8)}$

Here all the Lie algebras are the split real form except for so_{3}, but a sign change in the definition of the Lie bracket can be used to produce the split form so_{2,1}. In particular, for the exceptional Lie algebras, the maximal compact subalgebras are as follows:

Split form	$\mathfrak{f}_{4(4)}$	$\mathfrak{e}_{6(6)}$	$\mathfrak{e}_{7(7)}$	$\mathfrak{e}_{8(8)}$
Maximal compact	$\mathfrak{sp}_3\oplus\mathfrak{sp}_1$	$\mathfrak{sp}_4$	$\mathfrak{su}_8$	$\mathfrak{so}_{16}$

A non-symmetric version of the magic square can also be obtained by combining the split algebras with the usual division algebras. According to Barton and Sudbery, the resulting table of Lie algebras is as follows.

A\B	R	C	H	O
R	$\mathfrak{so}_3$	$\mathfrak{su}_3$	$\mathfrak{sp}_3$	$\mathfrak{f}_{4}$
C'	$\mathfrak{sl}_3(\mathbf R)$	$\mathfrak{sl}_3(\mathbf C)$	$\mathfrak{sl}_3(\mathbf H)$	$\mathfrak{e}_{6(-26)}$
H'	$\mathfrak{sp}_6(\mathbf R)$	$\mathfrak{su}_{3,3}$	$\mathfrak{so}^*_6(\mathbf H)$	$\mathfrak{e}_{7(-25)}$
O'	$\mathfrak{f}_{4(4)}$	$\mathfrak{e}_{6(2)}$	$\mathfrak{e}_{7(-5)}$	$\mathfrak{e}_{8(-24)}$

The real exceptional Lie algebras appearing here can again be described by their maximal compact subalgebras.

Lie algebra	$\mathfrak{e}_{6(2)}$	$\mathfrak{e}_{6(-26)}$	$\mathfrak{e}_{7(-5)}$	$\mathfrak{e}_{7(-25)}$	$\mathfrak{e}_{8(-24)}$
Maximal compact	$\mathfrak{su}_6\oplus\mathfrak{sp}_1$	$\mathfrak{f}_4$	$\mathfrak{su}_{12}\oplus\mathfrak{sp}_1$	$\mathfrak{e}_6\oplus\mathfrak{u}_1$	$\mathfrak{e}_7\oplus\mathfrak{sp}_1$

=== Arbitrary fields ===
The split forms of the composition algebras and Lie algebras can be defined over any field K. This yields the following magic square.

$\mathfrak{so}_3(\mathbf K)$	$\mathfrak{sl}_3(\mathbf K)$	$\mathfrak{sp}_6(\mathbf K)$	$\mathfrak{f}_{4}(\mathbf K)$
$\mathfrak{sl}_3(\mathbf K)$	$\mathfrak{sl}_3(\mathbf K)\oplus\mathfrak{sl}_3(\mathbf K)$	$\mathfrak{sl}_6(\mathbf K)$	$\mathfrak{e}_{6}(\mathbf K)$
$\mathfrak{sp}_6(\mathbf K)$	$\mathfrak{sl}_6(\mathbf K)$	$\mathfrak{so}_{12}(\mathbf K)$	$\mathfrak{e}_{7}(\mathbf K)$
$\mathfrak{f}_{4}(\mathbf K)$	$\mathfrak{e}_{6}(\mathbf K)$	$\mathfrak{e}_{7}(\mathbf K)$	$\mathfrak{e}_{8}(\mathbf K)$

There is some ambiguity here if K is not algebraically closed. In the case K = C, this is the complexification of the Freudenthal magic squares for R discussed so far.

=== More general Jordan algebras ===
The squares discussed so far are related to the Jordan algebras J_{3}(A), where A is a division algebra. There are also Jordan algebras J_{n}(A), for any positive integer n, as long as A is associative. These yield split forms (over any field K) and compact forms (over R) of generalized magic squares.

$\mathfrak{so}_n(\mathbf K)$	$\mathfrak{sl}_n(\mathbf K)\text{ or }\mathfrak{su}_n$	$\mathfrak{sp}_{2n}(\mathbf K)\text{ or }\mathfrak{sp}_n$
$\mathfrak{sl}_n(\mathbf K)\text{ or }\mathfrak{su}_n$	$\mathfrak{sl}_n(\mathbf K)\oplus\mathfrak{sl}_n(\mathbf K)\text{ or }\mathfrak{su}_n\oplus\mathfrak{su}_n$	$\mathfrak{sl}_{2n}(\mathbf K)\text{ or }\mathfrak{su}_{2n}$
$\mathfrak{sp}_{2n}(\mathbf K)\text{ or }\mathfrak{sp}_n$	$\mathfrak{sl}_{2n}(\mathbf K)\text{ or }\mathfrak{su}_{2n}$	$\mathfrak{so}_{4n}(\mathbf K)$

For n = 2, J_{2}(O) is also a Jordan algebra. In the compact case (over R) this yields a magic square of orthogonal Lie algebras.

A\B	R	C	H	O
R	$\mathfrak{so}_2$	$\mathfrak{so}_3$	$\mathfrak{so}_5$	$\mathfrak{so}_9$
C	$\mathfrak{so}_3$	$\mathfrak{so}_4$	$\mathfrak{so}_6$	$\mathfrak{so}_{10}$
H	$\mathfrak{so}_5$	$\mathfrak{so}_6$	$\mathfrak{so}_8$	$\mathfrak{so}_{12}$
O	$\mathfrak{so}_9$	$\mathfrak{so}_{10}$	$\mathfrak{so}_{12}$	$\mathfrak{so}_{16}$

The last row and column here are the orthogonal algebra part of the isotropy algebra in the symmetric decomposition of the exceptional Lie algebras mentioned previously.

These constructions are closely related to hermitian symmetric spaces – cf. prehomogeneous vector spaces.

=== Symmetric spaces ===
Riemannian symmetric spaces, both compact and non-compact, can be classified uniformly using a magic square construction, in (Huang & Leung 2010). The irreducible compact symmetric spaces are, up to finite covers, either a compact simple Lie group, a Grassmannian, a Lagrangian Grassmannian, or a double Lagrangian Grassmannian of subspaces of $(\mathbf A \otimes \mathbf B)^n,$ for normed division algebras A and B. A similar construction produces the irreducible non-compact symmetric spaces.

== History ==
=== Rosenfeld projective planes ===
Following Ruth Moufang's discovery in 1933 of the Cayley projective plane or "octonionic projective plane" P^{2}(O), whose symmetry group is the exceptional Lie group F_{4}, and with the knowledge that G_{2} is the automorphism group of the octonions, it was proposed by Rozenfeld (1956) that the remaining exceptional Lie groups E_{6}, E_{7}, and E_{8} are isomorphism groups of projective planes over certain algebras over the octonions:

- the bioctonions, C ⊗ O,
- the quateroctonions, H ⊗ O,
- the octooctonions, O ⊗ O.

This proposal is appealing, as there are certain exceptional compact Riemannian symmetric spaces with the desired symmetry groups and whose dimension agree with that of the putative projective planes (dim(P^{2}(K ⊗ K′)) = 2 dim(K)dim(K′)), and this would give a uniform construction of the exceptional Lie groups as symmetries of naturally occurring objects (i.e., without an a priori knowledge of the exceptional Lie groups). The Riemannian symmetric spaces were classified by Cartan in 1926 (Cartan's labels are used in sequel); see classification for details, and the relevant spaces are:

- the octonionic projective plane – FII, dimension 16 = 2 × 8, F_{4} symmetry, Cayley projective plane P^{2}(O),
- the bioctonionic projective plane – EIII, dimension 32 = 2 × 2 × 8, E_{6} symmetry, complexified Cayley projective plane, P^{2}(C ⊗ O),
- the "quateroctonionic projective plane" – EVI, dimension 64 = 2 × 4 × 8, E_{7} symmetry, P^{2}(H ⊗ O),
- the "octooctonionic projective plane" – EVIII, dimension 128 = 2 × 8 × 8, E_{8} symmetry, P^{2}(O ⊗ O).

The difficulty with this proposal is that while the octonions are a division algebra, and thus a projective plane is defined over them, the bioctonions, quateroctonions and octooctonions are not division algebras, and thus the usual definition of a projective plane does not work. This can be resolved for the bioctonions, with the resulting projective plane being the complexified Cayley plane, but the constructions do not work for the quateroctonions and octooctonions, and the spaces in question do not obey the usual axioms of projective planes, hence the quotes on "(putative) projective plane". However, the tangent space at each point of these spaces can be identified with the plane (H ⊗ O)^{2}, or (O ⊗ O)^{2} further justifying the intuition that these are a form of generalized projective plane. Accordingly, the resulting spaces are sometimes called Rosenfeld projective planes and notated as if they were projective planes. More broadly, these compact forms are the Rosenfeld elliptic projective planes, while the dual non-compact forms are the Rosenfeld hyperbolic projective planes. A more modern presentation of Rosenfeld's ideas is in (Rosenfeld 1997), while a brief note on these "planes" is in (Besse 1987, pp. 313–316).

The spaces can be constructed using Tits' theory of buildings, which allows one to construct a geometry with any given algebraic group as symmetries, but this requires starting with the Lie groups and constructing a geometry from them, rather than constructing a geometry independently of a knowledge of the Lie groups.

=== Magic square ===
While at the level of manifolds and Lie groups, the construction of the projective plane P^{2}(K ⊗ K′) of two normed division algebras does not work, the corresponding construction at the level of Lie algebras does work. That is, if one decomposes the Lie algebra of infinitesimal isometries of the projective plane P^{2}(K) and applies the same analysis to P^{2}(K ⊗ K′), one can use this decomposition, which holds when P^{2}(K ⊗ K′) can actually be defined as a projective plane, as a definition of a "magic square Lie algebra" M(K,K′). This definition is purely algebraic, and holds even without assuming the existence of the corresponding geometric space. This was done independently circa 1958 in (Tits 1966) and by Freudenthal in a series of 11 papers, starting with (Freudenthal 1954a) and ending with (Freudenthal 1963), though the simplified construction outlined here is due to (Vinberg 1966).

== See also ==
- E6 (mathematics)
- E7 (mathematics)
- E8 (mathematics)
- F4 (mathematics)
- G2 (mathematics)
- Euclidean Hurwitz algebra
- Euclidean Jordan algebra
- Jordan triple system
