= Bergstein =

Bergstein is German for "hill rock" and may refer to:

== Places ==
- Bergstein (Hürtgenwald), a village in the parish of Hürtgenwald, county of Düren, North Rhine-Westphalia
- Bergstein (Gemeinde Völkermarkt), a village in the borough of Völkermarkt, Province of Völkermarkt, Carinthia

== Natural monuments ==
- Bergstein (Hohe Loog), near Neustadt an der Weinstraße
- Bergstein (Weinbiet), near Neustadt an der Weinstraße

== People ==
- Brian Bergstein
- David Bergstein (born 1962), American entrepreneur and film producer
- Eleanor Bergstein (born 1938), American writer, best known for writing and co-producing the film Dirty Dancing
- Fania Bergstein (1908–1950), Hebrew poet, born in Szczuczyn, in Russian Poland
- Iben Bergstein (born 1995), Danish badminton player
- Nahum Bergstein (1932-2011), Uruguayan lawyer and politician
- Stan Bergstein (1924–2011), American sports executive
- Svend Bergstein (1941–2014), Danish officer and politician

== See also ==
- Steinberg (disambiguation)
