= E6 (mathematics) =

78-dimensional exceptional simple Lie group

In mathematics, E_{6} is the name of some closely related Lie groups, linear algebraic groups or their Lie algebras $\mathfrak{e}_6$, all of which have dimension 78; the same notation E_{6} is used for the corresponding root lattice, which has rank 6. The designation E_{6} comes from the Cartan–Killing classification of the complex simple Lie algebras (see Élie Cartan § Work). This classifies Lie algebras into four infinite series labeled A_{n}, B_{n}, C_{n}, D_{n}, and five exceptional cases labeled E_{6}, E_{7}, E_{8}, F_{4}, and G_{2}. The E_{6} algebra is thus one of the five exceptional cases.

The fundamental group of the adjoint form of E_{6} (as a complex or compact Lie group) is the cyclic group Z/3Z, and its outer automorphism group is the cyclic group Z/2Z. For the simply-connected form, its fundamental representation is 27-dimensional, and a basis is given by the 27 lines on a cubic surface. The dual representation, which is inequivalent, is also 27-dimensional.

In particle physics, E_{6} plays a role in some grand unified theories.

== Real and complex forms ==
There is a unique complex Lie algebra of type E_{6}, corresponding to a complex group of complex dimension 78. The complex adjoint Lie group E_{6} of complex dimension 78 can be considered as a simple real Lie group of real dimension 156. This has fundamental group Z/3Z, has maximal compact subgroup the compact form (see below) of E_{6}, and has an outer automorphism group non-cyclic of order 4 generated by complex conjugation and by the outer automorphism which already exists as a complex automorphism.

As well as the complex Lie group of type E_{6}, there are five real forms of the Lie algebra, and correspondingly five real forms of the group with trivial center (all of which have an algebraic double cover, and three of which have further non-algebraic covers, giving further real forms), all of real dimension 78, as follows:

- The compact form (which is usually the one meant if no other information is given), which has fundamental group Z/3Z and outer automorphism group Z/2Z.
- The split form, EI (or E_{6(6)}), which has maximal compact subgroup Sp(4)/(±1), fundamental group of order 2 and outer automorphism group of order 2.
- The quasi-split form EII (or E_{6(2)}), which has maximal compact subgroup SU(2) × SU(6)/(center), fundamental group cyclic of order 6 and outer automorphism group of order 2.
- EIII (or E_{6(-14)}), which has maximal compact subgroup SO(2) × Spin(10)/(center), fundamental group Z and trivial outer automorphism group.
- EIV (or E_{6(-26)}), which has maximal compact subgroup F_{4}, trivial fundamental group cyclic and outer automorphism group of order 2.

The EIV form of E_{6} is the group of collineations (line-preserving transformations) of the octonionic projective plane OP^{2}. It is also the group of determinant-preserving linear transformations of the exceptional Jordan algebra. The exceptional Jordan algebra is 27-dimensional, which explains why the compact real form of E_{6} has a 27-dimensional complex representation. The compact real form of E_{6} is the isometry group of a 32-dimensional Riemannian manifold known as the 'bioctonionic projective plane'; similar constructions for E_{7} and E_{8} are known as the Rosenfeld projective planes, and are part of the Freudenthal magic square.

== E_{6} as an algebraic group ==
By means of a Chevalley basis for the Lie algebra, one can define E_{6} as a linear algebraic group over the integers and, consequently, over any commutative ring and in particular over any field: this defines the so-called split (sometimes also known as "untwisted") adjoint form of E_{6}. Over an algebraically closed field, this and its triple cover are the only forms; however, over other fields, there are often many other forms, or "twists" of E_{6}, which are classified in the general framework of Galois cohomology (over a perfect field k) by the set H^{1}(k, Aut(E_{6})) which, because the Dynkin diagram of E_{6} (see below) has automorphism group Z/2Z, maps to H^{1}(k, Z/2Z) = Hom (Gal(k), Z/2Z) with kernel H^{1}(k, E_{6,ad}).

Over the field of real numbers, the real component of the identity of these algebraically twisted forms of E_{6} coincide with the three real Lie groups mentioned above, but with a subtlety concerning the fundamental group: all adjoint forms of E_{6} have fundamental group Z/3Z in the sense of algebraic geometry, with Galois action as on the third roots of unity; this means that they admit exactly one triple cover (which may be trivial on the real points); the further non-compact real Lie group forms of E_{6} are therefore not algebraic and admit no faithful finite-dimensional representations. The compact real form of E_{6} as well as the noncompact forms EI = E_{6(6)} and EIV = E_{6(-26)} are said to be inner or of type ^{1}E_{6} meaning that their class lies in H^{1}(k, E_{6,ad}) or that complex conjugation induces the trivial automorphism on the Dynkin diagram, whereas the other two real forms are said to be outer or of type ^{2}E_{6}.

Over finite fields, the Lang–Steinberg theorem implies that H^{1}(k, E_{6}) = 0, meaning that E_{6} has exactly one twisted form, known as ^{2}E_{6}: see below.

=== Automorphisms of an Albert algebra ===
The algebraic group G_{2} is the automorphism group of the octonions. The exceptional Jordan algebra $A$ of dimension 27, known as the Albert algebra, can be viewed as the space of $3\times 3$ self-adjoint matrices over the octonions. The algebraic group F_{4} is the automorphism group of this Jordan algebra; all such automorphisms also preserve a cubic form on $A$ called the "determinant". In these terms, the algebraic group E_{6} is the group of automorphisms of $A$ as a vector space that preserve the determinant (but need not preserve the Jordan algebra structure).

== Algebra ==
=== Dynkin diagram ===
The Dynkin diagram for E_{6} is given by, which may also be drawn as.

=== Roots of E_{6} ===
The 72 vertices of the 1_{22} polytope represent the root vectors of the E_{6}, as shown in this Coxeter plane projection. Orange vertices are doubled in this projection. Coxeter–Dynkin diagram:

Although they span a six-dimensional space, it is much more symmetrical to consider them as vectors in a six-dimensional subspace of a nine-dimensional space. Then one can take the roots to be

(1,−1,0;0,0,0;0,0,0), (−1,1,0;0,0,0;0,0,0),
(−1,0,1;0,0,0;0,0,0), (1,0,−1;0,0,0;0,0,0),
(0,1,−1;0,0,0;0,0,0), (0,−1,1;0,0,0;0,0,0),
(0,0,0;1,−1,0;0,0,0), (0,0,0;−1,1,0;0,0,0),
(0,0,0;−1,0,1;0,0,0), (0,0,0;1,0,−1;0,0,0),
(0,0,0;0,1,−1;0,0,0), (0,0,0;0,−1,1;0,0,0),
(0,0,0;0,0,0;1,−1,0), (0,0,0;0,0,0;−1,1,0),
(0,0,0;0,0,0;−1,0,1), (0,0,0;0,0,0;1,0,−1),
(0,0,0;0,0,0;0,1,−1), (0,0,0;0,0,0;0,−1,1),

plus all 27 combinations of $(\mathbf{3};\mathbf{3};\mathbf{3})$ where $\mathbf{3}$ is one of $\left(\frac{2}{3}, -\frac{1}{3}, -\frac{1}{3}\right),\ \left( -\frac{1}{3}, \frac{2}{3}, -\frac{1}{3}\right),\ \left( -\frac{1}{3}, -\frac{1}{3}, \frac{2}{3} \right),$ plus all 27 combinations of $(\bar{\mathbf{3}};\bar{\mathbf{3}};\bar{\mathbf{3}})$ where $\bar{\mathbf{3}}$ is one of $\left(-\frac{2}{3},\frac{1}{3},\frac{1}{3}\right),\ \left(\frac{1}{3}, -\frac{2}{3}, \frac{1}{3} \right),\ \left( \frac{1}{3}, \frac{1}{3}, -\frac{2}{3} \right).$

Simple roots

One possible selection for the simple roots of E_{6} is:

(0,0,0;0,0,0;0,1,−1)

(0,0,0;0,0,0;1,−1,0)

(0,0,0;0,1,−1;0,0,0)

(0,0,0;1,−1,0;0,0,0)

(0,1,−1;0,0,0;0,0,0)

$$\left(\frac{1}{3},-\frac{2}{3},\frac{1}{3};-\frac{2}{3},\frac{1}{3},\frac{1}{3};-\frac{2}{3},\frac{1}{3},\frac{1}{3}\right)$$

Graph of E_{6} as a subgroup of E_{8} projected into the Coxeter plane

Hasse diagram of E_{6} root poset with edge labels identifying added simple root position

==== E_{6} roots derived from the roots of E_{8} ====
E_{6} is the subset of E_{8} where a consistent set of three coordinates are equal (e.g. first or last). This facilitates explicit definitions of E_{7} and E_{6} as:

E_{7} = {α ∈ Z^{7} ∪ (Z+1/2)^{7} : Σα_{i}^{2} + α_{1}^{2} = 2, Σα_{i} + α_{1} ∈ 2Z},
E_{6} = {α ∈ Z^{6} ∪ (Z+1/2)^{6} : Σα_{i}^{2} + 2α_{1}^{2} = 2, Σα_{i} + 2α_{1} ∈ 2Z}

The following 72 E_{6} roots are derived in this manner from the split real even E_{8} roots. Notice the last 3 dimensions being the same as required:

==== An alternative description ====
An alternative (6-dimensional) description of the root system, which is useful in considering E_{6} × SU(3) as a subgroup of E_{8}, is the following:

All
$$4\times\begin{pmatrix}5\\2\end{pmatrix}$$
permutations of

$(\pm1,\pm1,0,0,0,0)$ preserving the zero at the last entry,

and all of the following roots with an odd number of plus signs

$$\left(\pm{1\over 2},\pm{1\over 2},\pm{1\over 2},\pm{1\over 2},\pm{1\over 2},\pm{\sqrt{3}\over 2}\right).$$

Thus the 78 generators consist of the following subalgebras:

A 45-dimensional SO(10) subalgebra, including the above
$$4\times\begin{pmatrix}5\\2\end{pmatrix}$$
generators plus the five Cartan generators corresponding to the first five entries.
Two 16-dimensional subalgebras that transform as a Weyl spinor of $\operatorname{spin}(10)$ and its complex conjugate. These have a non-zero last entry.
1 generator which is their chirality generator, and is the sixth Cartan generator.

One choice of simple roots for E_{6} is given by the rows of the following matrix, indexed in the order :

$$\left [\begin{smallmatrix}
1&-1&0&0&0&0 \\
0&1&-1&0&0&0 \\
0&0&1&-1&0&0 \\
0&0&0&1&1&0 \\
-\frac{1}{2}&-\frac{1}{2}&-\frac{1}{2}&-\frac{1}{2}&-\frac{1}{2}&\frac{\sqrt{3}}{2}\\
0&0&0&1&-1&0 \\
\end{smallmatrix}\right ]$$

=== Weyl group ===
The Weyl group of E_{6} is of order 51840: it is the automorphism group of the unique simple group of order 25920 (which can be described as any of: PSU_{4}(2), PSΩ_{6}^{−}(2), PSp_{4}(3) or PSΩ_{5}(3)).

=== Cartan matrix ===
$$\left [\begin{smallmatrix}
2&-1&0&0&0&0\\
-1&2&-1&0&0&0\\
0&-1&2&-1&0&-1\\
0&0&-1&2&-1&0\\
0&0&0&-1&2&0\\
0&0&-1&0&0&2
\end{smallmatrix}\right ]$$

== Important subalgebras and representations ==
Embeddings of the maximal subgroups of E_{6} up to dimension 78 with associated projection matrix.

The Lie algebra E_{6} has an F_{4} subalgebra, which is the fixed subalgebra of an outer automorphism, and an SU(3) × SU(3) × SU(3) subalgebra. Other maximal subalgebras which have an importance in physics (see below) and can be read off the Dynkin diagram, are the algebras of SO(10) × U(1) and SU(6) × SU(2).

In addition to the 78-dimensional adjoint representation, there are two dual 27-dimensional "vector" representations.

The characters of finite dimensional representations of the real and complex Lie algebras and Lie groups are all given by the Weyl character formula. The dimensions of the smallest irreducible representations are (sequence A121737 in the OEIS):

1, 27 (twice), 78, 351 (four times), 650, 1728 (twice), 2430, 2925, 3003 (twice), 5824 (twice), 7371 (twice), 7722 (twice), 17550 (twice), 19305 (four times), 34398 (twice), 34749, 43758, 46332 (twice), 51975 (twice), 54054 (twice), 61425 (twice), 70070, 78975 (twice), 85293, 100386 (twice), 105600, 112320 (twice), 146432 (twice), 252252 (twice), 314496 (twice), 359424 (four times), 371800 (twice), 386100 (twice), 393822 (twice), 412776 (twice), 442442 (twice)...

The underlined terms in the sequence above are the dimensions of those irreducible representations possessed by the adjoint form of E_{6} (equivalently, those whose weights belong to the root lattice of E_{6}), whereas the full sequence gives the dimensions of the irreducible representations of the simply connected form of E_{6}.

The symmetry of the Dynkin diagram of E_{6} explains why many dimensions occur twice, the corresponding representations being related by the non-trivial outer automorphism; however, there are sometimes even more representations than this, such as four of dimension 351, two of which are fundamental and two of which are not.

The fundamental representations have dimensions 27, 351, 2925, 351, 27 and 78 (corresponding to the six nodes in the Dynkin diagram in the order chosen for the Cartan matrix above, i.e., the nodes are read in the five-node chain first, with the last node being connected to the middle one).

The embeddings of the maximal subgroups of E_{6} up to dimension 78 are shown to the right.

== E6 polytope ==
The E_{6} polytope is the convex hull of the roots of E_{6}. It therefore exists in 6 dimensions; its symmetry group contains the Coxeter group for E_{6} as an index 2 subgroup.

== Chevalley and Steinberg groups of type E_{6} and ^{2}E_{6} ==
The groups of type E_{6} over arbitrary fields (in particular finite fields) were introduced by Dickson (1901, 1908).

The points over a finite field with q elements of the (split) algebraic group E_{6} (see above), whether of the adjoint (centerless) or simply connected form (its algebraic universal cover), give a finite Chevalley group. This is closely connected to the group written E_{6}(q), however there is ambiguity in this notation, which can stand for several things:

- the finite group consisting of the points over F_{q} of the simply connected form of E_{6} (for clarity, this can be written E_{6,sc}(q) or more rarely $\tilde E_6(q)$ and is known as the "universal" Chevalley group of type E_{6} over F_{q}),
- (rarely) the finite group consisting of the points over F_{q} of the adjoint form of E_{6} (for clarity, this can be written E_{6,ad}(q), and is known as the "adjoint" Chevalley group of type E_{6} over F_{q}), or
- the finite group which is the image of the natural map from the former to the latter: this is what will be denoted by E_{6}(q) in the following, as is most common in texts dealing with finite groups.

From the finite group perspective, the relation between these three groups, which is quite analogous to that between SL(n,q), PGL(n,q) and PSL(n,q), can be summarized as follows: E_{6}(q) is simple for any q, E_{6,sc}(q) is its Schur cover, and E_{6,ad}(q) lies in its automorphism group; furthermore, when q−1 is not divisible by 3, all three coincide, and otherwise (when q is congruent to 1 mod 3), the Schur multiplier of E_{6}(q) is 3 and E_{6}(q) is of index 3 in E_{6,ad}(q), which explains why E_{6,sc}(q) and E_{6,ad}(q) are often written as 3·E_{6}(q) and E_{6}(q)·3. From the algebraic group perspective, it is less common for E_{6}(q) to refer to the finite simple group, because the latter is not in a natural way the set of points of an algebraic group over F_{q} unlike E_{6,sc}(q) and E_{6,ad}(q).

Beyond this "split" (or "untwisted") form of E_{6}, there is also one other form of E_{6} over the finite field F_{q}, known as ^{2}E_{6}, which is obtained by twisting by the non-trivial automorphism of the Dynkin diagram of E_{6}. Concretely, ^{2}E_{6}(q), which is known as a Steinberg group, can be seen as the subgroup of E_{6}(q^{2}) fixed by the composition of the non-trivial diagram automorphism and the non-trivial field automorphism of F_{q^{2}}. Twisting does not change the fact that the algebraic fundamental group of ^{2}E_{6,ad} is Z/3Z, but it does change those q for which the covering of ^{2}E_{6,ad} by ^{2}E_{6,sc} is non-trivial on the F_{q}-points. Precisely: ^{2}E_{6,sc}(q) is a covering of ^{2}E_{6}(q), and ^{2}E_{6,ad}(q) lies in its automorphism group; when q+1 is not divisible by 3, all three coincide, and otherwise (when q is congruent to 2 mod 3), the degree of ^{2}E_{6,sc}(q) over ^{2}E_{6}(q) is 3 and ^{2}E_{6}(q) is of index 3 in ^{2}E_{6,ad}(q), which explains why ^{2}E_{6,sc}(q) and ^{2}E_{6,ad}(q) are often written as 3·^{2}E_{6}(q) and ^{2}E_{6}(q)·3.

Two notational issues should be raised concerning the groups ^{2}E_{6}(q). One is that this is sometimes written ^{2}E_{6}(q^{2}), a notation which has the advantage of transposing more easily to the Suzuki and Ree groups, but the disadvantage of deviating from the notation for the F_{q}-points of an algebraic group. Another is that whereas ^{2}E_{6,sc}(q) and ^{2}E_{6,ad}(q) are the F_{q}-points of an algebraic group, the group in question also depends on q (e.g., the points over F_{q^{2}} of the same group are the untwisted E_{6,sc}(q^{2}) and E_{6,ad}(q^{2})).

The groups E_{6}(q) and ^{2}E_{6}(q) are simple for any q, and constitute two of the infinite families in the classification of finite simple groups. Their order is given by the following formula (sequence A008872 in the OEIS):

$$|E_6 (q)| = \frac{1}{\mathrm{gcd}(3,q-1)}q^{36}(q^{12}-1)(q^9-1)(q^8-1)(q^6-1)(q^5-1)(q^2-1)$$
$$|{}^2\!E_6 (q)| = \frac{1}{\mathrm{gcd}(3,q+1)}q^{36}(q^{12}-1)(q^9+1)(q^8-1)(q^6-1)(q^5+1)(q^2-1)$$

(sequence A008916 in the OEIS). The order of E_{6,sc}(q) or E_{6,ad}(q) (both are equal) can be obtained by removing the dividing factor gcd(3,q−1) from the first formula (sequence A008871 in the OEIS), and the order of ^{2}E_{6,sc}(q) or ^{2}E_{6,ad}(q) (both are equal) can be obtained by removing the dividing factor gcd(3,q+1) from the second (sequence A008915 in the OEIS).

The Schur multiplier of E_{6}(q) is always gcd(3,q−1) (i.e., E_{6,sc}(q) is its Schur cover). The Schur multiplier of ^{2}E_{6}(q) is gcd(3,q+1) (i.e., ^{2}E_{6,sc}(q) is its Schur cover) outside of the exceptional case q=2 where it is 2^{2}·3 (i.e., there is an additional 2^{2}-fold cover). The outer automorphism group of E_{6}(q) is the product of the diagonal automorphism group Z/gcd(3,q−1)Z (given by the action of E_{6,ad}(q)), the group Z/2Z of diagram automorphisms, and the group of field automorphisms (i.e., cyclic of order f if q=p^{f} where p is prime). The outer automorphism group of ^{2}E_{6}(q) is the product of the diagonal automorphism group Z/gcd(3,q+1)Z (given by the action of ^{2}E_{6,ad}(q)) and the group of field automorphisms (i.e., cyclic of order f if q=p^{f} where p is prime).

== Importance in physics ==
The pattern of weak isospin, W, weaker isospin, W′, strong g3 and g8, and baryon minus lepton, B, charges for particles in the SO(10) Grand Unified Theory, rotated to show the embedding in E_{6}.

N = 8 supergravity in five dimensions, which is a dimensional reduction from eleven-dimensional supergravity, admits an E_{6} bosonic global symmetry and an Sp(8) bosonic local symmetry. The fermions are in representations of Sp(8), the gauge fields are in a representation of E_{6}, and the scalars are in a representation of both (gravitons are singlets with respect to both). Physical states are in representations of the coset E_{6}/Sp(8).

In grand unification theories, E_{6} appears as a possible gauge group which, after its breaking, gives rise to the SU(3) × SU(2) × U(1) gauge group of the Standard Model. One way of achieving this is through breaking to SO(10) × U(1). The adjoint 78 representation breaks, as explained above, into an adjoint 45, spinor 16 and 1̅6̅ as well as a singlet of the SO(10) subalgebra. Including the U(1) charge we have

$$78 \rightarrow 45_0 \oplus 16_{-3} \oplus \overline{16}_3 + 1_0.$$

Where the subscript denotes the U(1) charge.

Likewise, the fundamental representation 27 and its conjugate 2̅7̅ break into a scalar 1, a vector 10 and a spinor, either 16 or 1̅6̅:

$$27 \rightarrow 1_4 \oplus 10_{-2} \oplus 16_1,$$
$$\bar{27} \rightarrow 1_{-4} \oplus 10_2 \oplus \overline{16}_{-1}.$$

Thus, one can get the Standard Model's elementary fermions and Higgs boson.

== See also ==
- E_{n} (Lie algebra)
- ADE classification
- Freudenthal magic square
