= Steinberg (disambiguation) =

Steinberg is a German musical software and equipment company.

Steinberg may also refer to:

- Steinberg (surname)

== Companies ==
- Steinberg's (supermarket), defunct Canadian supermarket chain
- Steinberg's (electronics store), a defunct chain of electronics stores in the United States

== Places ==
=== Austria ===
- Steinberg am Rofan, in Tyrol
- Steinberg-Dörfl, in Burgenland
- Rohrbach-Steinberg in Steiermark

=== Germany ===
- Steinberg am See, Schwandorf, Bavaria
- Steinberg, Saxony
- Steinberg, Schleswig-Holstein
- Steinberg, Kloster Eberbach, a wall-enclosed vineyard near Hattenheim

Mountains and hills

- Steinberg (Kaufungen Forest), Hesse
- Steinberg (Leine Uplands), Lower Saxony
- Steinberg (Lower Bavaria), Bavaria
- Steinberg (Swabian Jura), Baden-Württemberg
- Steinberg (Wittgendorf), Saxony

=== Elsewhere ===
- Steinberg, Norway, a village in Buskerud county
- Steinberg (Włodzickie Hills), a hill in Kłodzko County, Poland

== See also ==
- Floyd–Steinberg dithering, a dithering algorithm
- Steinberg group (disambiguation)
- Steinberg representation
- Steinberger, a brand of bass guitar
- Steinburg (disambiguation)
- Bergstein (disambiguation)
