= 2E6 =

2E6 may refer to:

- EIA Class 2 dielectric
- ^{2}E_{6} group in mathematics
