= Steinberger (surname) =

Steinberger is a surname. Notable people with the surname include:

- Emil Steinberger (actor) (born 1933), Swiss comedian, writer, director and actor.
- Gábor Darvas (formerly Gábor Steinberger) (1911–1985), Hungarian composer
- Heinz Steinberger (born 1958), Austrian ice speed skater
- Jack Steinberger (1921–2020), German-born physicist and Nobel Prize winner
- Julia Steinberger (born 1974) American-born ecological economist
- Justus Steinberger (?–1870), United States Army officer
- Lucianne Goldberg (born Lucianne Steinberger, 1935–2022), American literary agent
- Michael Steinberger, American wine columnist of Slate
- Ned Steinberger, American guitar designer, founder and namesake of the guitar company
- Peter Steinberger, political philosopher and dean of faculty at Reed College
- Peter Steinberger (born 1986), Austrian computer programmer

== See also ==
- Steinberger (disambiguation)
- Steinberg (surname)
