= Steinburg (disambiguation) =

Steinburg is a district of Schleswig-Holstein, Germany.

Steinburg may also refer to:

- Steinburg, Stormarn, a municipality in the district of Stormarn, Schleswig-Holstein, Germany
- Steinburg, Saxony-Anhalt, a municipality in the district Burgenlandkreis, Saxony-Anhalt, Germany
- Bob Steinburg (born 1948), American politician

== See also ==
- Steinbourg
- Steinberg (disambiguation)
