= Prehomogeneous vector space =

In mathematics, a prehomogeneous vector space (PVS) is a finite-dimensional vector space V together with a subgroup G of the general linear group GL(V) such that G has an open dense orbit in V. The term prehomogeneous vector space was introduced by Mikio Sato in 1970. These spaces have many applications in geometry, number theory and analysis, as well as representation theory. The irreducible PVS were classified first by Vinberg in his 1960 thesis in the special case when G is simple and later by Sato and Tatsuo Kimura in 1977 in the general case by means of a transformation known as "castling". They are subdivided into two types, according to whether the semisimple part of G acts prehomogeneously or not. If it doesn't then there is a homogeneous polynomial on V which is invariant under the semisimple part of G.

== Setting ==
In the setting of Sato, G is an algebraic group and V is a rational representation of G which has a (nonempty) open orbit in the Zariski topology. However, PVS can also be studied from the point of view of Lie theory: for instance, in Knapp (2002), G is a complex Lie group and V is a holomorphic representation of G with an open dense orbit. The two approaches are essentially the same, and the theory has validity over the real numbers. We assume, for simplicity of notation, that the action of G on V is a faithful representation. We can then identify G with its image in GL(V), although in practice it is sometimes convenient to let G be a covering group.

Although prehomogeneous vector spaces do not necessarily decompose into direct sums of irreducibles, it is natural to study the irreducible PVS (i.e., when V is an irreducible representation of G). In this case, a theorem of Élie Cartan shows that

G ≤ GL(V)

is a reductive group, with a centre that is at most one-dimensional. This, together with the obvious dimensional restriction

dim G ≥ dim V,

is the key ingredient in the Sato–Kimura classification.

== Castling ==
The classification of PVS is complicated by the following fact. Suppose m > n > 0 and V is an m-dimensional representation of G over a field F. Then:

(G × SL(n), V ⊗ F^{n}) is a PVS if and only if (G × SL(m − n), V^{*} ⊗ F^{m−n}) is a PVS.

The proof is to observe that both conditions are equivalent to there being an open dense orbit of the action of G on the Grassmannian of n-planes in V, because this is isomorphic to the Grassmannian of (m − n)-planes in V^{*}.

(In the case that G is reductive, the pair (G, V) is equivalent to the pair (G, V^{*}) by an automorphism of G.)

This transformation of PVS is called castling. Given a PVS V, a new PVS can be obtained by tensoring V with F and castling. By repeating this process, and regrouping tensor products, many new examples can be obtained, which are said to be "castling-equivalent". Thus PVS can be grouped into castling equivalence classes. Sato and Kimura show that in each such class, there is essentially one PVS of minimal dimension, which they call "reduced", and they classify the reduced irreducible PVS.

== Classification ==
The classification of irreducible reduced PVS (G, V) splits into two cases: those for which G is semisimple, and those for which it is reductive with one-dimensional centre. If G is semisimple, it is (perhaps a covering of) a subgroup of SL(V), and hence G × GL(1) acts prehomogenously on V, with one-dimensional centre. We exclude such trivial extensions of semisimple PVS from the PVS with one-dimensional center. In other words, in the case that G has one-dimensional center, we assume that the semisimple part does not act prehomogeneously; it follows that there is a relative invariant, i.e., a function invariant under the semisimple part of G, which is homogeneous of a certain degree d.

This makes it possible to restrict attention to semisimple G ≤ SL(V) and split the classification as follows:

1. (G, V) is a PVS;
2. (G, V) is not a PVS, but (G × GL(1), V) is.

However, it turns out that the classification is much shorter, if one allows not just products with GL(1), but also with SL(n) and GL(n). This is quite natural in terms of the castling transformation discussed previously. Thus we wish to classify irreducible reduced PVS in terms of semisimple G ≤ SL(V) and n ≥ 1 such that either:

1. (G × SL(n), V ⊗ F^{n}) is a PVS;
2. (G × SL(n), V ⊗ F^{n}) is not a PVS, but (G × GL(n), V ⊗ F^{n}) is.

In the latter case, there is a homogeneous polynomial which separates the G × GL(n) orbits into G × SL(n) orbits.

This has an interpretation in terms of the grassmannian Gr_{n}(V) of n-planes in V (at least for n ≤ dim V). In both cases G acts on Gr_{n}(V) with a dense open orbit U. In the first case the complement Gr_{n}(V) ∖ U has codimension ≥ 2; in the second case it is a divisor of some degree d, and the relative invariant is a homogeneous polynomial of degree nd.

In the following, the classification list will be presented over the complex numbers.

=== General examples ===
G	V	Type 1	Type 2	Type 2 isotropy group	Degree
G ⊆ SL(m, C)	C^{m}	n ≥ m+1	n = m	G	m
SL(m, C)	C^{m}	m − 1 ≥ n ≥ 1^{*}			
SL(m, C)	Λ^{2}C^{m}	m odd, n = 1, 2	m even, n = 1	Sp(m, C)	m/2
SL(m, C)	S^{2}C^{m}		n = 1	SO(m, C)	m
SO(m, C)	C^{m}		m − 1 ≥ n ≥ 1^{*}	SO(n, C) × SO(m − n, C)	2
Sp(2m, C)	C^{2m}	2m − 1 ≥ n ≥ 1^{*}, n odd	2m − 1 ≥ n ≥ 1^{*}, n even	Sp(n, C) × Sp(2m − n, C)	1

^{*} Strictly speaking, we must restrict to n ≤ (dim V)/2 to obtain a reduced example.

=== Irregular examples ===
Type 1

Spin(10, C) on C^{16}

Type 2

Sp(2m, C) × SO(3, C) on C^{2m} ⊗ C^{3}

Both of these examples are PVS only for n = 1.

=== Remaining examples ===
The remaining examples are all type 2. To avoid discussing the finite groups appearing, the lists present the Lie algebra of the isotropy group rather than the isotropy group itself.

G	V	n	Isotropy algebra	Degree
SL(2, C)	S^{3}C^{2}	1	0	4
SL(6, C)	Λ^{3}C^{6}	1	$\mathfrak{sl}$(3, C) × $\mathfrak{sl}$(3, C)	4
SL(7, C)	Λ^{3}C^{7}	1	$\mathfrak{g}$^{C}_{2}	7
SL(8, C)	Λ^{3}C^{8}	1	$\mathfrak{sl}$(3, C)	16
SL(3, C)	S^{2}C^{3}	2	0	6
SL(5, C)	Λ^{2}C^{3}	3, 4	$\mathfrak{sl}$(2, C), 0	5, 10
SL(6, C)	Λ^{2}C^{3}	2	$\mathfrak{sl}$(2, C) × $\mathfrak{sl}$(2, C) × $\mathfrak{sl}$(2, C)	6
SL(3, C) × SL(3, C)	C^{3} ⊗ C^{3}	2	$\mathfrak{gl}$(1, C) × $\mathfrak{gl}$(1, C)	6
Sp(6, C)	Λ^{3}_{0}C^{6}	1	$\mathfrak{sl}$(3, C)	4
Spin(7, C)	C^{8}	1, 2, 3	$\mathfrak{g}$^{C}_{2}, $\mathfrak{sl}$(3, C) × $\mathfrak{so}$(2, C), $\mathfrak{sl}$(2, C) × $\mathfrak{so}$(3, C)	2, 2, 2
Spin(9, C)	C^{16}	1	$\mathfrak{spin}$(7, C)	2
Spin(10, C)	C^{16}	2, 3	$\mathfrak{g}$^{C}_{2} × $\mathfrak{sl}$(2, C), $\mathfrak{sl}$(2, C) × $\mathfrak{so}$(3, C)	2, 4
Spin(11, C)	C^{32}	1	$\mathfrak{sl}$(5, C)	4
Spin(12, C)	C^{32}	1	$\mathfrak{sl}$(6, C)	4
Spin(14, C)	C^{64}	1	$\mathfrak{g}$^{C}_{2} × $\mathfrak{g}$^{C}_{2}	8
G^{C}_{2}	C^{7}	1, 2	$\mathfrak{sl}$(3, C), $\mathfrak{gl}$(2, C)	2, 2
E^{C}_{6}	C^{27}	1, 2	$\mathfrak{f}$^{C}_{4}, $\mathfrak{so}$(8, C)	3, 6
E^{C}_{7}	C^{56}	1	$\mathfrak{e}$^{C}_{6}	4

Here Λ^{3}_{0}C^{6} ≅ C^{14} denotes the space of 3-forms whose contraction with the given symplectic form is zero.

== Proofs ==
Sato and Kimura establish this classification by producing a list of possible irreducible prehomogeneous (G, V), using the fact that G is reductive and the dimensional restriction. They then check whether each member of this list is prehomogeneous or not.

However, there is a general explanation why most of the pairs (G, V) in the classification are prehomogeneous, in terms of isotropy representations of generalized flag varieties. Indeed, in 1974, Richardson observed that if H is a semisimple Lie group with a parabolic subgroup P, then the action of P on the nilradical $\mathfrak{p}$^{⊥} of its Lie algebra has a dense open orbit. This shows in particular (and was noted independently by Vinberg in 1975) that the Levi factor G of P acts prehomogeneously on V := $\mathfrak{p}$^{⊥}/[$\mathfrak{p}$^{⊥}, $\mathfrak{p}$^{⊥}]. Almost all of the examples in the classification can be obtained by applying this construction with P a maximal parabolic subgroup of a simple Lie group H: these are classified by connected Dynkin diagrams with one distinguished node.

== Applications ==
One reason that PVS are interesting is that they classify generic objects that arise in G-invariant situations. For example, if G = GL(7), then the above tables show that there are generic 3-forms under the action of G, and the stabilizer of such a 3-form is isomorphic to the exceptional Lie group G_{2}.

Another example concerns the prehomogeneous vector spaces with a cubic relative invariant. By the Sato-Kimura classification, there are essentially four such examples, and they all come from complexified isotropy representations of hermitian symmetric spaces for a larger group H (i.e., G is the semisimple part of the stabilizer of a point, and V is the corresponding tangent representation).

In each case a generic point in V identifies it with the complexification of a Jordan algebra of 3 × 3 hermitian matrices (over the division algebras R, C, H and O respectively) and the cubic relative invariant is identified with a suitable determinant. The isotropy algebra of such a generic point, the Lie algebra of G and the Lie algebra of H give the complexifications of the first three rows of the Freudenthal magic square.

H	G	V	Isotropy algebra	Jordan algebra
Sp(6, C)	SL(3, C)	S^{2}C^{3}	$\mathfrak{so}$(3, C)	J_{3}(R)
SL(6, C)	SL(3, C) × SL(3, C)	C^{3} ⊗ C^{3}	$\mathfrak{sl}$(3, C)	J_{3}(C)
SO(12, C)	SL(6, C)	Λ^{2}C^{6}	$\mathfrak{sp}$(6, C)	J_{3}(H)
E^{C}_{7}	E^{C}_{6}	C^{27}	$\mathfrak{f}$^{C}_{4}	J_{3}(O)

Other Hermitian symmetric spaces yields prehomogeneous vector spaces whose generic points define Jordan algebras in a similar way.

H	G	V	Isotropy algebra	Jordan algebra
Sp(2n, C)	SL(n, C)	S^{2}C^{n}	$\mathfrak{so}$(n, C)	J_{n}(R)
SL(2n, C)	SL(n, C) × SL(n, C)	C^{n} ⊗ C^{n}	$\mathfrak{sl}$(n, C)	J_{n}(C)
SO(4n, C)	SL(2n, C)	Λ^{2}C^{2n}	$\mathfrak{sp}$(2n, C)	J_{n}(H)
SO(m + 2, C)	SO(m, C)	C^{m}	$\mathfrak{so}$(m − 1, C)	J(m − 1)

The Jordan algebra J(m − 1) in the last row is the spin factor (which is the vector space R^{m−1} ⊕ R, with a Jordan algebra structure defined using the inner product on R^{m−1}). It reduces to J_{2}(R), J_{2}(C), J_{2}(H), J_{2}(O) for m = 3, 4, 6 and 10 respectively.

The relation between hermitian symmetric spaces and Jordan algebras can be explained using Jordan triple systems.
