= Cayley plane =

Projective plane

In mathematics, the Cayley plane (or octonionic projective plane) P^{2}(O) is a projective plane over the octonions.

The Cayley plane was discovered in 1933 by Ruth Moufang, and is named after Arthur Cayley for his 1845 paper describing the octonions.

== Properties ==
In the Cayley plane, lines and points may be defined in a natural way so that it becomes a 2-dimensional projective space, that is, a projective plane. It is a non-Desarguesian plane, where Desargues' theorem does not hold.

More precisely, as of 2005, there are two objects called Cayley planes, namely the real and the complex Cayley plane. The real Cayley plane is the symmetric space F_{4}/Spin(9), where F_{4} is a compact form of an exceptional Lie group and Spin(9) is the spin group of nine-dimensional Euclidean space (realized in F_{4}). It admits a cell decomposition into three cells, of dimensions 0, 8 and 16.

The complex Cayley plane is a homogeneous space under the complexification of the group E_{6} by a parabolic subgroup P_{1}. It is the closed orbit in the projectivization of the minimal complex representation of E_{6}. The complex Cayley plane consists of two complex F_{4}-orbits: the closed orbit is a quotient of the complexified F_{4} by a parabolic subgroup, the open orbit is the complexification of the real Cayley plane, retracting to it.

== See also ==
- Rosenfeld projective plane
- Arnold–Kuiper–Massey theorem
