= Steinberg (surname) =

Steinberg is an Ashkenazi Jewish and German surname. Variants: Shteinberg, Steinbarg and Sztejnberg, Sztajnberg in Polish. Notable people with the surname include:

== Music ==
- Billy Steinberg (1950–2026), American songwriter
- Elliot Easton (born Elliot Steinberg, 1953), American musician
- Karl Steinberg (born 1952), German founder of the musical software company Steinberg
- Lev Steinberg (1870–1945), Russian conductor and composer
- Lewie Steinberg, American bassist in the band Booker T. & the M.G.'s
- Maximilian Steinberg (1883–1946), Lithuanian-Russian composer
- Michael Steinberg (music critic) (1928–2009), American music critic and musicologist
- Michael P. Steinberg, American historian
- Pinchas Steinberg (born 1945), Israeli conductor
- Sebastian Steinberg (born 1959), American bassist in the band Soul Coughing
- Simon Steinberg (1887–1955), Ukrainian composer
- William Steinberg (1899–1978), German-American conductor

== Culture ==
- David Steinberg (born 1942), Canadian comedian, actor, director, and writer
- David I. Steinberg (1928–2024), American historian of Asia
- Eduard Steinberg (1937-2012), Russian painter, philosopher and activist
- Flo Steinberg (1939–2017), American independent comic book publisher
- Hans H. Steinberg (born 1950), German actor
- Jacob Steinberg (1887–1947), Israeli poet
- Jonathan Steinberg (1934–2021), American historian of Germany
- Joshua Steinberg (1839–1908), Lithuanian-Russian writer and educator
- Kate Steinberg, American internet and television personality
- Leo Steinberg (1920–2011), American art historian
- Michael Steinberg (filmmaker), American film director and producer
- Morleigh Steinberg (born 1964), American dancer and choreographer
- Neil Steinberg (born 1960), American columnist
- Saul Steinberg (1914–1999), Romanian-American cartoonist, notably for the New Yorker
- Susan Steinberg (author) American author and artist (painter)
- Susan Steinberg (producer) American television writer/ producer / director

== Science ==
- Deborah Lynn Steinberg, British sociologist
- Gerald M. Steinberg, Israeli political scientist
- Hannah Steinberg (1926–2019), British psychopharmacologist
- Robert Steinberg, American mathematician
- Rudolf Steinberg (born 1943), German professor, president of the Johann Wolfgang Goethe-University
- Malcolm S. Steinberg (1930–2012), American biologist

== Other people ==
- Alexander “Sasha” Hedges Steinberg, American drag queen, artist, actor and producer known as Sasha Velour
- Annie Sprinkle (Born Ellen F. Steinberg, 1954), American pornographic actress sex educator and former prostitute
- Darrell Steinberg (born 1959), Mayor of the city of Sacramento, California
- Erna Steinberg (1911–2001), German Olympic sprinter
- Gerry Steinberg (1945–2015), British politician
- Isaac Nachman Steinberg, (1888–1957) left-revolutionary-politician, lawyer and writer
- James B. Steinberg, American politician (Deputy Secretary of State)
- Joel Steinberg (born 1941), American attorney convicted of manslaughter
- Joseph Steinberg (1883–1932), New York politician
- Judith Steinberg Dean (born 1953), American physician and former First Lady of Vermont
- Leigh Steinberg (born 1949), American sports agent
- Leonard Steinberg, Baron Steinberg (1936–2009), British businessman
- Mark Steinberg American sports agent (for Tiger Woods)
- Max Steinberg (soldier) (1989–2014), American-Israeli IDF lone soldier killed in the 2014 Gaza War
- Melvin Steinberg (1933–2026), American politician
- Sam Steinberg (1905–1978), Canadian supermarket magnate
- Saul Steinberg (business) (1939–2012), American investor

== Fictional characters ==
- Charlie "Chuck" and Ruth “Ruthie” Steinberg, siblings in the 2019 film Scary Stories to Tell in the Dark
- Lance J. Steinberg, motor vehicles driver from the Marvel Comics' series G.I. Joe: A Real American Hero

== See also ==
- Steinberg (disambiguation)
- Steinberger (disambiguation)
