= Cartan–Ambrose–Hicks theorem =

In mathematics, the Cartan–Ambrose–Hicks theorem is a theorem of Riemannian geometry, according to which the Riemannian metric is locally determined by the Riemann curvature tensor, or in other words, behavior of the curvature tensor under parallel translation determines the metric.

The theorem is named after Élie Cartan, Warren Ambrose, and his PhD student Noel Hicks. Cartan proved the local version. Ambrose proved a global version that allows for isometries between general Riemannian manifolds with varying curvature, in 1956. This was further generalized by Hicks to general manifolds with affine connections in their tangent bundles, in 1959.

A statement and proof of the theorem can be found in

== Introduction ==
Let $M,N$ be connected, complete Riemannian manifolds. We consider the problem of isometrically mapping a small patch on $M$ to a small patch on $N$.

Let $x\in M,y\in N$, and let

$$I:T_xM\rightarrow T_yN$$

be a linear isometry. This can be interpreted as isometrically mapping an infinitesimal patch (the tangent space) at $x$ to an infinitesimal patch at $y$. Now we attempt to extend it to a finite (rather than infinitesimal) patch.

For sufficiently small $r>0$, the exponential maps

$$\exp_x:B_r(x)\subset T_xM\rightarrow M, \exp_y:B_r(y)\subset T_yN\rightarrow N$$

are local diffeomorphisms. Here, $B_r(x)$ is the ball centered on $x$ of radius $r.$ One then defines a diffeomorphism $f:B_r(x)\rightarrow B_r(y)$ by

$$f=\exp_y\circ I\circ \exp_x^{-1}.$$

When is $f$ an isometry? Intuitively, it should be an isometry if it satisfies the two conditions:

- It is a linear isometry at the tangent space of every point on $B_r(x)$, that is, it is an isometry on the infinitesimal patches.
- It preserves the curvature tensor at the tangent space of every point on $B_r(x)$, that is, it preserves how the infinitesimal patches fit together.

If $f$ is an isometry, it must preserve the geodesics. Thus, it is natural to consider the behavior of $f$ as we transport it along an arbitrary geodesic radius $\gamma:\left[0,T\right]\rightarrow B_r(x)\subset M$ starting at $\gamma(0)=x$. By property of the exponential mapping, $f$ maps it to a geodesic radius of $B_r(y)$ starting at $f(\gamma)(0)=y$,.

Let $P_\gamma(t)$ be the parallel transport along $\gamma$ (defined by the Levi-Civita connection), and $P_{f(\gamma)(t)}$ be the parallel transport along $f(\gamma)$, then we have the mapping between infinitesimal patches along the two geodesic radii:

$$I_\gamma(t)=P_{f(\gamma)(t)}\circ I\circ P_{\gamma(t)}^{-1}:T_{\gamma(t)}M\rightarrow T_{f(\gamma(t))}N \quad \text{ for all } t\in [0, T]$$

== Cartan's theorem ==
The original theorem proven by Cartan is the local version of the Cartan–Ambrose–Hicks theorem.

$f$ is an isometry if and only if for all geodesic radii $\gamma:\left[0,T\right]\rightarrow B_r(x)\subset M$ with $\gamma(0)=x$, and all $t\in [0, T], X,Y,Z\in T_{\gamma(t)}M$, we have $I_{\gamma}(t)(R(X,Y,Z))=\overline{R}(I_{\gamma}(t)(X), I_\gamma(t)(Y), I_{\gamma}(t)(Z))$ where $R,\overline{R}$ are Riemann curvature tensors of $M,N$.

In words, it states that $f$ is an isometry if and only if the only way to preserve its infinitesimal isometry also preserves the Riemannian curvature.

Note that $f$ generally does not have to be a diffeomorphism, but only a locally isometric covering map. However, $f$ must be a global isometry if $N$ is simply connected.

== Cartan–Ambrose–Hicks theorem ==
Theorem: For Riemann curvature tensors $R,\overline{R}$ and all broken geodesics (a broken geodesic is a curve that is piecewise geodesic) $\gamma:\left[0,T\right]\rightarrow M$ with $\gamma(0)=x$, suppose that

$$I_\gamma(t)(R(X,Y,Z))=\overline{R}(I_\gamma(t)(X), I_\gamma(t)(Y), I_\gamma(t)(Z))$$

for all $t\in [0, T], X,Y,Z\in T_{\gamma(t)}M$.

Then, if two broken geodesics beginning at $x$ have the same endpoint, the corresponding broken geodesics (mapped by $I_\gamma$) in $N$ also have the same end point. Consequently, there exists a map $F:M\rightarrow N$ defined by mapping the broken geodesic endpoints in $M$ to the corresponding geodesic endpoints in $N$.

The map $F:M\rightarrow N$ is a locally isometric covering map.

If $N$ is also simply connected, then $F$ is an isometry.

== Locally symmetric spaces ==
A Riemannian manifold is called locally symmetric if its Riemann curvature tensor is invariant under parallel transport:

$$\nabla R=0.$$

A simply connected Riemannian manifold is locally symmetric if it is a symmetric space.

From the Cartan–Ambrose–Hicks theorem, we have:

Theorem: Let $M,N$ be connected, complete, locally symmetric Riemannian manifolds, and let $M$ be simply connected. Let their Riemann curvature tensors be $R,\overline{R}$. Let $x\in M,y\in N$ and

$$I:T_xM\rightarrow T_yN$$

be a linear isometry with $I(R(X,Y,Z))=\overline{R}(I(X),I(Y),I(Z))$. Then there exists a locally isometric covering map

$$F:M\rightarrow N$$

with $F(x)=y$ and $D_xF=I$.

Corollary: Any complete locally symmetric space is of the form $M/\Gamma$, where $M$ is a symmetric space and $\Gamma\subset \mathrm{Isom}(M)$ is a discrete subgroup of isometries of $M$.

== Classification of space forms ==
As an application of the Cartan–Ambrose–Hicks theorem, any simply connected, complete Riemannian manifold with constant sectional curvature $\in\{+1, 0, -1\}$ is respectively isometric to the n-sphere $S^n$, the n-Euclidean space $E^n$, and the n-hyperbolic space $\mathbb H^n$.
