= En (Lie algebra) =

Dynkin diagrams
Finite
E_{3}=A_{2}A_{1}
E_{4}=A_{4}
E_{5}=D_{5}
E_{6}
E_{7}
E_{8}
Affine (Extended)
E_{9} or E^{(1)}_{8} or E^{+}_{8}
Hyperbolic (Over-extended)
E_{10} or E^{(1)^}_{8} or E^{++}_{8}
Lorentzian (Very-extended)
E_{11} or E^{+++}_{8}
Kac–Moody
E_{12} or E^{++++}_{8}
...

In mathematics, especially in Lie theory, E_{n} is the Kac–Moody algebra whose Dynkin diagram is a bifurcating graph with three branches of length 1, 2 and k, with k = n − 4.

In some older books and papers, E_{2} and E_{4} are used as names for G_{2} and F_{4}.

== Finite-dimensional Lie algebras ==
The E_{n} group is similar to the A_{n} group, except the nth node is connected to the 3rd node. So the Cartan matrix appears similar, −1 above and below the diagonal, except for the last row and column, have −1 in the third row and column. The determinant of the Cartan matrix for E_{n} is 9 − n.

- E_{3} is another name for the Lie algebra A_{1}A_{2} of dimension 11, with Cartan determinant 6.
  $$\left [
\begin{matrix}
2 & -1 &  0 \\
-1 &  2 &  0 \\
0 &  0 &  2
\end{matrix}\right ]$$
- E_{4} is another name for the Lie algebra A_{4} of dimension 24, with Cartan determinant 5.
  $$\left [
\begin{matrix}
2 & -1 &  0 &  0 \\
-1 &  2 & -1&  0  \\
0 & -1 &  2 & -1 \\
0 &  0 & -1 &  2
\end{matrix}\right ]$$
- E_{5} is another name for the Lie algebra D_{5} of dimension 45, with Cartan determinant 4.
  $$\left [
\begin{matrix}
2 & -1 &  0 &  0 &  0 \\
-1 &  2 & -1&  0 &  0  \\
0 & -1 &  2 & -1 &  -1 \\
0 &  0 & -1 &  2 & 0 \\
0 &  0 &  -1 & 0 &  2
\end{matrix}\right ]$$
- E_{6} is the exceptional Lie algebra of dimension 78, with Cartan determinant 3.
  $$\left [
\begin{matrix}
2 & -1 &  0 &  0 &  0 &  0 \\
-1 &  2 & -1&  0 &  0 &  0 \\
0 & -1 &  2 & -1 &  0 &  -1 \\
0 &  0 & -1 &  2 & -1 &  0 \\
0 &  0 &  0 & -1 &  2 & 0 \\
0 &  0 &  -1 &  0 & 0 &  2
\end{matrix}\right ]$$
- E_{7} is the exceptional Lie algebra of dimension 133, with Cartan determinant 2.
  $$\left [
\begin{matrix}
2 & -1 &  0 &  0 &  0 &  0 &  0 \\
-1 &  2 & -1&  0 &  0 &  0 &  0  \\
0 & -1 &  2 & -1 &  0 &  0 &  -1 \\
0 &  0 & -1 &  2 & -1 &  0 &  0 \\
0 &  0 &  0 & -1 &  2 & -1 &  0 \\
0 &  0 &  0 &  0 & -1 &  2 & 0 \\
0 &  0 & -1 &  0 &  0 &  0 &  2
\end{matrix}\right ]$$
- E_{8} is the exceptional Lie algebra of dimension 248, with Cartan determinant 1.
  $$\left [
\begin{matrix}
2 & -1 &  0 &  0 &  0 &  0 &  0 & 0 \\
-1 &  2 & -1&  0 &  0 &  0 &  0 & 0 \\
0 & -1 &  2 & -1 &  0 &  0 &  0 & -1 \\
0 &  0 & -1 &  2 & -1 &  0 &  0 & 0 \\
0 &  0 &  0 & -1 &  2 & -1 &  0 & 0 \\
0 &  0 &  0 &  0 & -1 &  2 & -1 & 0 \\
0 &  0 &  0 &  0 &  0 & -1 &  2 & 0 \\
0 &  0 & -1 &  0 &  0 &  0 &  0 & 2
\end{matrix}\right ]$$

== Infinite-dimensional Lie algebras ==
- E_{9} is another name for the infinite-dimensional affine Lie algebra Ẽ_{8} (also as E^{+}_{8} or E^{(1)}_{8} as a (one-node) extended E_{8}) (or E_{8} lattice) corresponding to the Lie algebra of type E_{8}. E_{9} has a Cartan matrix with determinant 0.
  $$\left [
\begin{matrix}
2 & -1 &  0 &  0 &  0 &  0 &  0 & 0 & 0 \\
-1 &  2 & -1&  0 &  0 &  0 &  0 & 0 & 0 \\
0 & -1 &  2 & -1 &  0 &  0 &  0 & 0 & -1 \\
0 &  0 & -1 &  2 & -1 &  0 &  0 & 0 & 0 \\
0 &  0 &  0 & -1 &  2 & -1 &  0 & 0 & 0 \\
0 &  0 &  0 &  0 & -1 &  2 & -1 & 0 & 0 \\
0 &  0 &  0 &  0 &  0 & -1 &  2 & -1 & 0 \\
0 &  0 &  0 &  0 &  0 & 0 &  -1 & 2 & 0 \\
0 & 0 &  -1 &  0 &  0 &  0 &  0 &  0 & 2
\end{matrix}\right ]$$
- E_{10} (or E^{++}_{8} or E^{(1)^}_{8} as a (two-node) over-extended E_{8}) is an infinite-dimensional Kac–Moody algebra whose root lattice is the even Lorentzian unimodular lattice II_{9,1} of dimension 10. Some of its root multiplicities have been calculated; for small roots the multiplicities seem to be well behaved, but for larger roots the observed patterns break down. E_{10} has a Cartan matrix with determinant −1:
  $$\left [
\begin{matrix}
2 & -1 &  0 &  0 &  0 &  0 &  0 & 0 & 0  & 0 \\
-1 &  2 & -1&  0 &  0 &  0 &  0 & 0 & 0 & 0 \\
0 & -1 &  2 & -1 &  0 &  0 &  0 & 0 & 0 & -1 \\
0 &  0 & -1 &  2 & -1 &  0 &  0 & 0 & 0 & 0  \\
0 &  0 &  0 & -1 &  2 & -1 &  0 & 0 & 0 & 0  \\
0 &  0 &  0 &  0 & -1 &  2 & -1 & 0 & 0 & 0  \\
0 &  0 &  0 &  0 &  0 & -1 &  2 & -1 & 0 & 0  \\
0 &  0 &  0 &  0 &  0 & 0 &  -1 & 2 & -1 & 0  \\
0 &  0 &  0 &  0 &  0 & 0 &  0 & -1 & 2 & 0  \\
0 & 0 &  -1 &  0 &  0 &  0 &  0 &  0 &  0 & 2
\end{matrix}\right ]$$
- E_{11} (or E^{+++}_{8} as a (three-node) very-extended E_{8}) is a Lorentzian algebra, containing one time-like imaginary dimension, that has been conjectured to generate the symmetry "group" of M-theory.
- E_{n} for n ≥ 12 is a family of infinite-dimensional Kac–Moody algebras that are not well studied.

== Root lattice ==
The root lattice of E_{n} has determinant 9 − n, and can be constructed as the lattice of vectors in the unimodular Lorentzian lattice Z_{n,1} that are orthogonal to the vector (1,1,1,1,...,1|3) of norm n × 1^{2} − 3^{2} = n − 9.

== E_{7 1/2} ==
Landsberg and Manivel extended the definition of E_{n} for integer n to include the case n = 7 1/2. They did this in order to fill the "hole" in dimension formulae for representations of the E_{n} series which was observed by Cvitanovic, Deligne, Cohen and de Man. E_{7 1/2} has dimension 190, but is not a simple Lie algebra: it contains a 57 dimensional Heisenberg algebra as its nilradical.

== See also ==
- k_{21}, 2_{k1}, 1_{k2} polytopes based on E_{n} Lie algebras.
