= 3D4 =

Family of mathematical groups

In mathematics, the Steinberg triality groups of type ^{3}D_{4} form a family of Steinberg or twisted Chevalley groups. They are quasi-split forms of D_{4}, depending on a cubic Galois extension of fields K ⊂ L, and using the triality automorphism of the Dynkin diagram D_{4}. Unfortunately the notation for the group is not standardized, as some authors write it as ^{3}D_{4}(K) (thinking of ^{3}D_{4} as an algebraic group taking values in K) and some as ^{3}D_{4}(L) (thinking of the group as a subgroup of D_{4}(L) fixed by an outer automorphism of order 3). The group ^{3}D_{4} is very similar to an orthogonal or spin group in dimension 8.

Over finite fields these groups form one of the 18 infinite families of finite simple groups, and were introduced by Steinberg (1959). They were independently discovered by Jacques Tits in Tits (1958) and Tits (1959).

== Construction ==
The simply connected split algebraic group of type D_{4} has a triality automorphism σ of order 3 coming from an order 3 automorphism of its Dynkin diagram. If L is a field with an automorphism τ of order 3, then this induced an order 3 automorphism τ of the group D_{4}(L). The group ^{3}D_{4}(L) is the subgroup of D_{4}(L) of points fixed by στ. It has three 8-dimensional representations over the field L, permuted by the outer automorphism τ of order 3.

== Over finite fields ==
The group ^{3}D_{4}(q^{3}) has order q^{12} (q^{8} + q^{4} + 1) (q^{6} − 1) (q^{2} − 1). For comparison, the split spin group D_{4}(q) in dimension 8 has order q^{12} (q^{8} − 2q^{4} + 1) (q^{6} − 1) (q^{2} − 1) and the quasisplit spin group ^{2}D_{4}(q^{2}) in dimension 8 has order q^{12} (q^{8} − 1) (q^{6} − 1) (q^{2} − 1).

The group ^{3}D_{4}(q^{3}) is always simple. The Schur multiplier is always trivial. The outer automorphism group is cyclic of order f where q^{3} = p^{f} and p is prime.

This group is also sometimes called ^{3}D_{4}(q), D_{4}^{2}(q^{3}), or a twisted Chevalley group.

== ^{3}D_{4}(2^{3}) ==
The smallest member of this family of groups has several exceptional properties not shared by other members of the family. It has order 211341312 = 2^{12}⋅3^{4}⋅7^{2}⋅13 and outer automorphism group of order 3.

The automorphism group of ^{3}D_{4}(2^{3}) is a maximal subgroup of the Thompson sporadic group, and is also a subgroup of the compact Lie group of type F_{4} of dimension 52. In particular it acts on the 26-dimensional representation of F_{4}. In this representation it fixes a 26-dimensional lattice that is the unique 26-dimensional even lattice of determinant 3 with no norm 2 vectors, studied by Elkies & Gross (1996). The dual of this lattice has 819 pairs of vectors of norm 8/3, on which ^{3}D_{4}(2^{3}) acts as a rank 4 permutation group.

The group ^{3}D_{4}(2^{3}) has 9 classes of maximal subgroups, of structure

2^{1+8}:L_{2}(8) fixing a point of the rank 4 permutation representation on 819 points.
[2^{11}]:(7 × S_{3})
U_{3}(3):2
S_{3} × L_{2}(8)
(7 × L_{2}(7)):2
3^{1+2}.2S_{4}
7^{2}:2A_{4}
3^{2}:2A_{4}
13:4

== See also ==
- List of finite simple groups
- ^{2}E_{6}
