= Steinberger (disambiguation) =

Steinberger is a series of electric guitars and bass guitars.

Steinberger may also refer to:

- Steinberger (surname)
- Steinberger, the term used on labels for wine from the vineyard Steinberg, Kloster Eberbach Rheingau
- Steinberger See, lake in Bavaria, Germany
