= Symmetric space =

(pseudo-)Riemannian manifold whose geodesics are reversible

In mathematics, a symmetric space is a Riemannian manifold (or more generally, a pseudo-Riemannian manifold) whose group of isometries contains an inversion symmetry about every point. This can be studied with the tools of Riemannian geometry, leading to consequences in the theory of holonomy; or algebraically through Lie theory, which allowed Cartan to give a complete classification. Symmetric spaces commonly occur in differential geometry, representation theory and harmonic analysis.

In geometric terms, a complete, simply connected Riemannian manifold is a symmetric space if and only if its curvature tensor is invariant under parallel transport. More generally, a Riemannian manifold (M, g) is said to be symmetric if and only if, for each point p of M, there exists an isometry of M fixing p and acting on the tangent space $T_pM$ as minus the identity (every symmetric space is complete, since any geodesic can be extended indefinitely via symmetries about the endpoints). Both descriptions can also naturally be extended to the setting of pseudo-Riemannian manifolds.

From the point of view of Lie theory, a symmetric space is the quotient G / H of a connected Lie group G by a closed subgroup H that is (a connected component of) the invariant group of an involution of G. This definition includes more than the Riemannian definition, and reduces to it when H is compact.

Riemannian symmetric spaces arise in a wide variety of situations in both mathematics and physics. Their central role in the theory of holonomy was discovered by Marcel Berger. They are important objects of study in representation theory and harmonic analysis as well as in differential geometry.

== Geometric definition ==
Let M be a connected Riemannian manifold and p a point of M. A diffeomorphism f of a neighborhood of p is said to be a geodesic symmetry if it fixes the point p and reverses geodesics through that point, i.e. if γ is a geodesic with $\gamma(0)=p$ then $f(\gamma(t))=\gamma(-t).$ It follows that the derivative of the map f at p is minus the identity map on the tangent space of p. On a general Riemannian manifold, f need not be isometric, nor can it be extended, in general, from a neighbourhood of p to all of M.

M is said to be locally Riemannian symmetric if its geodesic symmetries are in fact isometric. This is equivalent to the vanishing of the covariant derivative of the curvature tensor. A locally symmetric space is said to be a (globally) symmetric space if in addition its geodesic symmetries can be extended to isometries on all of M.

=== Basic properties ===
The Cartan–Ambrose–Hicks theorem implies that M is locally Riemannian symmetric if and only if its curvature tensor is covariantly constant, and furthermore that every simply connected, complete locally Riemannian symmetric space is actually Riemannian symmetric.

Every Riemannian symmetric space M is complete and Riemannian homogeneous (meaning that the isometry group of M acts transitively on M). In fact, already the identity component of the isometry group acts transitively on M (because M is connected).

Locally Riemannian symmetric spaces that are not Riemannian symmetric may be constructed as quotients of Riemannian symmetric spaces by discrete groups of isometries with no fixed points, and as open subsets of (locally) Riemannian symmetric spaces.

=== Examples ===
Basic examples of Riemannian symmetric spaces are Euclidean space, spheres, projective spaces, and hyperbolic spaces, each with their standard Riemannian metrics. More examples are provided by compact, semi-simple Lie groups equipped with a bi-invariant Riemannian metric.

Every compact Riemann surface of genus greater than 1 (with its usual metric of constant curvature −1) is a locally symmetric space but not a symmetric space.

Every lens space is locally symmetric but not symmetric, with the exception of the real projective space $L(2;1)$, which is symmetric. The lens spaces are quotients of the 3-sphere by a discrete isometry that has no fixed points.

An example of a non-Riemannian symmetric space is anti-de Sitter space.

== Algebraic definition ==
Let G be a connected Lie group. Then a symmetric space for G is a homogeneous space G / H where the stabilizer H of a typical point is an open subgroup of the fixed point subgroup $G^\sigma$ of an involution σ in Aut(G). Thus σ is an automorphism of G with σ^{2} = id_{G} and H is an open subgroup of the invariant subgroup

$$G^\sigma=\{ g\in G: \sigma(g) = g\}.$$

Because H is open, it is a union of components of G^{σ} (including, of course, the identity component).

As an automorphism of G, σ fixes the identity element, and hence, by differentiating at the identity, it induces an automorphism of the Lie algebra $\mathfrak g$ of G, also denoted by σ, whose square is the identity. It follows that the eigenvalues of σ are ±1. The +1 eigenspace is the Lie algebra $\mathfrak h$ of H (since this is the Lie algebra of G^{σ}), and the −1 eigenspace will be denoted $\mathfrak m$. Since σ is an automorphism of $\mathfrak g$, this gives a direct sum decomposition

$$\mathfrak g = \mathfrak h\oplus\mathfrak m$$

with

$$[\mathfrak h,\mathfrak h]\subset \mathfrak h,\; [\mathfrak h,\mathfrak m]\subset \mathfrak m,\; [\mathfrak m,\mathfrak m]\subset \mathfrak h.$$

The first condition is automatic for any homogeneous space: it just says the infinitesimal stabilizer $\mathfrak h$ is a Lie subalgebra of $\mathfrak g$. The second condition means that $\mathfrak m$ is an $\mathfrak h$-invariant complement to $\mathfrak h$ in $\mathfrak g$. Thus any symmetric space is a reductive homogeneous space, but there are many reductive homogeneous spaces which are not symmetric spaces. The key feature of symmetric spaces is the third condition that $\mathfrak m$ brackets into $\mathfrak h$.

Conversely, given any Lie algebra $\mathfrak g$ with a direct sum decomposition satisfying these three conditions, the linear map σ, equal to the identity on $\mathfrak h$ and minus the identity on $\mathfrak m$, is an involutive automorphism.

== Riemannian symmetric spaces satisfy the Lie-theoretic characterization ==
If M is a Riemannian symmetric space, the identity component G of the isometry group of M is a Lie group acting transitively on M (that is, M is Riemannian homogeneous). Therefore, if we fix some point p of M, M is diffeomorphic to the quotient G/K, where K denotes the isotropy group of the action of G on M at p. By differentiating the action at p we obtain an isometric action of K on T_{p}M. This action is faithful (e.g., by a theorem of Kostant, any isometry in the identity component is determined by its 1-jet at any point) and so K is a subgroup of the orthogonal group of T_{p}M, hence compact. Moreover, if we denote by s_{p}: M → M the geodesic symmetry of M at p, the map

$$\sigma: G \to G, h \mapsto s_p \circ h \circ s_p$$

is an involutive Lie group automorphism such that the isotropy group K is contained between the fixed point group $G^\sigma$ and its identity component (hence an open subgroup) $(G^\sigma)_o\,,$ see the definition and following proposition on page 209, chapter IV, section 3 in Helgason's Differential Geometry, Lie Groups, and Symmetric Spaces for further information.

To summarize, M is a symmetric space G / K with a compact isotropy group K. Conversely, symmetric spaces with compact isotropy group are Riemannian symmetric spaces, although not necessarily in a unique way. To obtain a Riemannian symmetric space structure we need to fix a K-invariant inner product on the tangent space to G / K at the identity coset eK: such an inner product always exists by averaging, since K is compact, and by acting with G, we obtain a G-invariant Riemannian metric g on G / K.

To show that G / K is Riemannian symmetric, consider any point p = hK (a coset of K, where h ∈ G) and define

$$s_p: M \to M,\quad h'K \mapsto h \sigma(h^{-1}h')K$$

where σ is the involution of G fixing K. Then one can check that s_{p} is an isometry with (clearly) s_{p}(p) = p and (by differentiating) ds_{p} equal to minus the identity on T_{p}M. Thus s_{p} is a geodesic symmetry and, since p was arbitrary, M is a Riemannian symmetric space.

If one starts with a Riemannian symmetric space M, and then performs these two constructions in sequence, then the Riemannian symmetric space yielded is isometric to the original one. This shows that the "algebraic data" (G, K, σ, g) completely describe the structure of M.

== Classification of Riemannian symmetric spaces ==
The algebraic description of Riemannian symmetric spaces enabled Élie Cartan to obtain a complete classification of them in 1926.

For a given Riemannian symmetric space M let (G, K, σ, g) be the algebraic data associated to it. To classify the possible isometry classes of M, first note that the universal cover of a Riemannian symmetric space is again Riemannian symmetric, and the covering map is described by dividing the connected isometry group G of the covering by a subgroup of its center. Therefore, we may suppose without loss of generality that M is simply connected. (This implies K is connected by the long exact sequence of a fibration, because G is connected by assumption.)

=== Classification scheme ===
A simply connected Riemannian symmetric space is said to be irreducible if it is not the product of two or more Riemannian symmetric spaces. It can then be shown that any simply connected Riemannian symmetric space is a Riemannian product of irreducible ones. Therefore, we may further restrict ourselves to classifying the irreducible, simply connected Riemannian symmetric spaces.

The next step is to show that any irreducible, simply connected Riemannian symmetric space M is of one of the following three types:

1. Euclidean type: M has vanishing curvature, and is therefore isometric to a Euclidean space.
2. Compact type: M has nonnegative (but not identically zero) sectional curvature.
3. Non-compact type: M has nonpositive (but not identically zero) sectional curvature.

A more refined invariant is the rank, which is the maximum dimension of a subspace of the tangent space (to any point) on which the curvature is identically zero. The rank is always at least one, with equality if the sectional curvature is positive or negative. If the curvature is positive, the space is of compact type, and if negative, it is of noncompact type. The spaces of Euclidean type have rank equal to their dimension and are isometric to a Euclidean space of that dimension. Therefore, it remains to classify the irreducible, simply connected Riemannian symmetric spaces of compact and non-compact type. In both cases there are two classes.

A. G is a (real) simple Lie group;

B. G is either the product of a compact simple Lie group with itself (compact type), or a complexification of such a Lie group (non-compact type).

The examples in class B are completely described by the classification of simple Lie groups. For compact type, M is a compact simply connected simple Lie group, G is M×M and K is the diagonal subgroup. For non-compact type, G is a simply connected complex simple Lie group and K is its maximal compact subgroup. In both cases, the rank is the rank of G.

The compact simply connected Lie groups are the universal covers of the classical Lie groups SO(n), SU(n), Sp(n) and the five exceptional Lie groups E_{6}, E_{7}, E_{8}, F_{4}, G_{2}.

The examples of class A are completely described by the classification of noncompact simply connected real simple Lie groups. For non-compact type, G is such a group and K is its maximal compact subgroup. Each such example has a corresponding example of compact type, by considering a maximal compact subgroup of the complexification of G that contains K. More directly, the examples of compact type are classified by involutive automorphisms of compact simply connected simple Lie groups G (up to conjugation). Such involutions extend to involutions of the complexification of G, and these in turn classify non-compact real forms of G.

In both class A and class B there is thus a correspondence between symmetric spaces of compact type and non-compact type. This is known as duality for Riemannian symmetric spaces.

=== Classification result ===
Specializing to the Riemannian symmetric spaces of class A and compact type, Cartan found that there are the following seven infinite series and twelve exceptional Riemannian symmetric spaces G / K. They are here given in terms of G and K, together with a geometric interpretation, if readily available. The labelling of these spaces is the one given by Cartan.

Label	G	K	Dimension	Rank	Geometric interpretation
AI	$\mathrm{SU}(n)\,$	$\mathrm{SO}(n)\,$	$(n-1)(n+2)/2$	$n-1$	Space of real structures on $\mathbb{C}^n$ that leave the complex determinant invariant
AII	$\mathrm{SU}(2n)\,$	$\mathrm{Sp}(n)\,$	$(n-1)(2n+1)$	$n-1$	Space of quaternionic structures on $\mathbb{C}^{2n}$ compatible with the Hermitian metric
AIII	$\mathrm{SU}(p+q)\,$	$\mathrm{S}(\mathrm{U}(p) \times \mathrm{U}(q))\,$	$2pq$	$\min(p,q)$	Grassmannian of complex p-dimensional subspaces of $\mathbb{C}^{p+q}$
BDI	$\mathrm{SO}(p+q)\,$	$\mathrm{SO}(p) \times \mathrm{SO}(q)\,$	$pq$	$\min(p,q)$	Grassmannian of oriented real p-dimensional subspaces of $\mathbb{R}^{p+q}$
DIII	$\mathrm{SO}(2n)\,$	$\mathrm{U}(n)\,$	$n(n-1)$	$[n/2]$	Space of orthogonal complex structures on $\mathbb{R}^{2n}$
CI	$\mathrm{Sp}(n)\,$	$\mathrm{U}(n)\,$	$n(n+1)$	$n$	Space of complex structures on $\mathbb{H}^n$ compatible with the inner product
CII	$\mathrm{Sp}(p+q)\,$	$\mathrm{Sp}(p) \times \mathrm{Sp}(q)\,$	$4pq$	$\min(p,q)$	Grassmannian of quaternionic p-dimensional subspaces of $\mathbb{H}^{p+q}$
EI	$E_6\,$	$\mathrm{Sp}(4)/\{\pm I\}\,$	42	6	
EII	$E_6\,$	$\mathrm{SU}(6)\cdot\mathrm{SU}(2)\,$	40	4	Space of symmetric subspaces of $(\mathbb C\otimes\mathbb O)P^2$ isometric to $(\mathbb C\otimes \mathbb H)P^2$
EIII	$E_6\,$	$\mathrm{SO}(10)\cdot\mathrm{SO}(2)\,$	32	2	Complexified Cayley projective plane $(\mathbb C\otimes\mathbb O)P^2$
EIV	$E_6\,$	$F_4\,$	26	2	Space of symmetric subspaces of $(\mathbb C\otimes\mathbb O)P^2$ isometric to $\mathbb{OP}^2$
EV	$E_7\,$	$\mathrm{SU}(8)/\{\pm I\}\,$	70	7	
EVI	$E_7\,$	$\mathrm{SO}(12)\cdot\mathrm{SU}(2)\,$	64	4	Rosenfeld projective plane $(\mathbb H\otimes\mathbb O)P^2$ over $\mathbb H\otimes\mathbb O$
EVII	$E_7\,$	$E_6\cdot\mathrm{SO}(2)\,$	54	3	Space of symmetric subspaces of $(\mathbb{H}\otimes\mathbb O)P^2$ isomorphic to $(\mathbb{C}\otimes\mathbb O)P^2$
EVIII	$E_8\,$	$\mathrm{Spin}(16)/\{\pm \mathrm{vol}\}\,$	128	8	Rosenfeld projective plane $(\mathbb O\otimes\mathbb O)P^2$
EIX	$E_8\,$	$E_7\cdot\mathrm{SU}(2)\,$	112	4	Space of symmetric subspaces of $(\mathbb{O}\otimes\mathbb O)P^2$ isomorphic to $(\mathbb{H}\otimes\mathbb O)P^2$
FI	$F_4\,$	$\mathrm{Sp}(3)\cdot \mathrm{SU}(2)\,$	28	4	Space of symmetric subspaces of $\mathbb{O}P^2$ isomorphic to $\mathbb{H}P^2$
FII	$F_4\,$	$\mathrm{Spin}(9)\,$	16	1	Cayley projective plane $\mathbb{O}P^2$
G	$G_2\,$	$\mathrm{SO}(4)\,$	8	2	Space of subalgebras of the octonion algebra $\mathbb{O}$ which are isomorphic to the quaternion algebra $\mathbb{H}$

=== As Grassmannians ===
A more modern classification (Huang & Leung 2010) uniformly classifies the Riemannian symmetric spaces, both compact and non-compact, via a Freudenthal magic square construction. The irreducible compact Riemannian symmetric spaces are, up to finite covers, either a compact simple Lie group, a Grassmannian, a Lagrangian Grassmannian, or a double Lagrangian Grassmannian of subspaces of $(\mathbf A \otimes \mathbf B)^n,$ for normed division algebras A and B. A similar construction produces the irreducible non-compact Riemannian symmetric spaces.

== General symmetric spaces ==
An important class of symmetric spaces generalizing the Riemannian symmetric spaces are pseudo-Riemannian symmetric spaces, in which the Riemannian metric is replaced by a pseudo-Riemannian metric (nondegenerate instead of positive definite on each tangent space). In particular, Lorentzian symmetric spaces, i.e., n dimensional pseudo-Riemannian symmetric spaces of signature (n − 1,1), are important in general relativity, the most notable examples being Minkowski space, De Sitter space and anti-de Sitter space (with zero, positive and negative curvature respectively). De Sitter space of dimension n may be identified with the 1-sheeted hyperboloid in a Minkowski space of dimension n + 1.

Symmetric and locally symmetric spaces in general can be regarded as affine symmetric spaces. If M = G / H is a symmetric space, then Nomizu showed that there is a G-invariant torsion-free affine connection (i.e. an affine connection whose torsion tensor vanishes) on M whose curvature is parallel. Conversely a manifold with such a connection is locally symmetric (i.e., its universal cover is a symmetric space). Such manifolds can also be described as those affine manifolds whose geodesic symmetries are all globally defined affine diffeomorphisms, generalizing the Riemannian and pseudo-Riemannian case.

=== Classification results ===
The classification of Riemannian symmetric spaces does not extend readily to the general case for the simple reason that there is no general splitting of a symmetric space into a product of irreducibles. Here a symmetric space G / H with Lie algebra

$$\mathfrak g = \mathfrak h\oplus \mathfrak m$$

is said to be irreducible if $\mathfrak m$ is an irreducible representation of $\mathfrak h$. Since $\mathfrak h$ is not semisimple (or even reductive) in general, it can have indecomposable representations which are not irreducible.

However, the irreducible symmetric spaces can be classified. As shown by Katsumi Nomizu, there is a dichotomy: an irreducible symmetric space G / H is either flat (i.e., an affine space) or $\mathfrak g$ is semisimple. This is the analogue of the Riemannian dichotomy between Euclidean spaces and those of compact or noncompact type, and it motivated M. Berger to classify semisimple symmetric spaces (i.e., those with $\mathfrak g$ semisimple) and determine which of these are irreducible. The latter question is more subtle than in the Riemannian case: even if $\mathfrak g$ is simple, G / H might not be irreducible.

As in the Riemannian case there are semisimple symmetric spaces with G = H × H. Any semisimple symmetric space is a product of symmetric spaces of this form with symmetric spaces such that $\mathfrak g$ is simple. It remains to describe the latter case. For this, one needs to classify involutions σ of a (real) simple Lie algebra $\mathfrak g$. If $\mathfrak g^c$ is not simple, then $\mathfrak g$ is a complex simple Lie algebra, and the corresponding symmetric spaces have the form G / H, where H is a real form of G: these are the analogues of the Riemannian symmetric spaces G / K with G a complex simple Lie group, and K a maximal compact subgroup.

Thus we may assume $\mathfrak g^c$ is simple. The real subalgebra $\mathfrak g$ may be viewed as the fixed point set of a complex antilinear involution τ of $\mathfrak g^c$, while σ extends to a complex antilinear involution of $\mathfrak g^c$ commuting with τ and hence also a complex linear involution σ∘τ.

The classification therefore reduces to the classification of commuting pairs of antilinear involutions of a complex Lie algebra. The composite σ∘τ determines a complex symmetric space, while τ determines a real form. From this it is easy to construct tables of symmetric spaces for any given $\mathfrak g^c$, and furthermore, there is an obvious duality given by exchanging σ and τ. This extends the compact/non-compact duality from the Riemannian case, where either σ or τ is a Cartan involution, i.e., its fixed point set is a maximal compact subalgebra.

=== Tables ===
The following table indexes the real symmetric spaces by complex symmetric spaces and real forms, for each classical and exceptional complex simple Lie group.

G^{c} = SL(n,C)	G^{c} / SO(n,C)	G^{c} / S(GL(k,C)×GL(ℓ,C)), k + ℓ = n	G^{c} / Sp(n,C), n even
G = SL(n,R)	G / SO(k,l)	G / S(GL(k,R)×GL(l,R)) or G / GL(n/2,C), n even	G / Sp(n,R), n even
G = SU(p,q), p + q = n	G / SO(p,q) or SU(p,p) / Sk(p,H)	G / S(U(k_{p},k_{q})×U(l_{p},l_{q})) or SU(p,p) / GL(p,C)	G / Sp(p/2,q/2), p,q even or SU(p,p) / Sp(2p,R)
G = SL(n/2,H), n even	G / Sk(n/2,H)	G / S(GL(k/2,H)×GL(ℓ/2,H)), k,ℓ even or G / GL(n/2,C)	G / Sp(k/2,ℓ/2), k,ℓ even, k + ℓ = n

G^{c}=SO(n,C)	G^{c} / SO(k,C)×SO(ℓ,C), k + ℓ = n	G^{c} / GL(n/2,C), n even
G=SO(p,q)	G / SO(k_{p},k_{q})×SO(ℓ_{p},l_{q}) or SO(n,n) / SO(n,C)	G / U(p/2,q/2), p,q even or SO(n,n) / GL(n,R)
G = Sk(n/2,H), n even	G / Sk(k/2,ℓ/2), k,ℓ even or G / SO(n/2,C)	G / U(k/2,ℓ/2), k,ℓ even or G / SL(n/4,H)

G^{c} = Sp(2n,C)	G^{c} / Sp(2k,C)×Sp(2ℓ,C), k + ℓ = n	G^{c} / GL(n,C)
G = Sp(p,q), p + q = n	G / Sp(k_{p},k_{q})×Sp(ℓ_{p},ℓ_{q}) or Sp(n,n) / Sp(n,C)	G / U(p,q) or Sp(p,p) / GL(p,H)
G = Sp(2n,R)	G / Sp(2k,R)×Sp(2l,R) or G / Sp(n,C)	G / U(k,ℓ), k + ℓ = n or G / GL(n,R)

For exceptional simple Lie groups, the Riemannian case is included explicitly below, by allowing σ to be the identity involution (indicated by a dash). In the above tables this is implicitly covered by the case kl = 0.

G_{2}^{c}	–	G_{2}^{c} / SL(2,C)×SL(2,C)
G_{2}	–	G_{2} / SU(2)×SU(2)
G_{2(2)}	G_{2(2)} / SU(2)×SU(2)	G_{2(2)} / SL(2,R)×SL(2,R)

F_{4}^{c}	–	F_{4}^{c} / Sp(6,C)×Sp(2,C)	F_{4}^{c} / SO(9,C)
F_{4}	–	F_{4} / Sp(3)×Sp(1)	F_{4} / SO(9)
F_{4(4)}	F_{4(4)} / Sp(3)×Sp(1)	F_{4(4)} / Sp(6,R)×Sp(2,R) or F_{4(4)} / Sp(2,1)×Sp(1)	F_{4(4)} / SO(5,4)
F_{4(−20)}	F_{4(−20)} / SO(9)	F_{4(−20)} / Sp(2,1)×Sp(1)	F_{4(−20)} / SO(8,1)

E_{6}^{c}	–	E_{6}^{c} / Sp(8,C)	E_{6}^{c} / SL(6,C)×SL(2,C)	E_{6}^{c} / SO(10,C)×SO(2,C)	E_{6}^{c} / F_{4}^{c}
E_{6}	–	E_{6} / Sp(4)	E_{6} / SU(6)×SU(2)	E_{6} / SO(10)×SO(2)	E_{6} / F_{4}
E_{6(6)}	E_{6(6)} / Sp(4)	E_{6(6)} / Sp(2,2) or E_{6(6)} / Sp(8,R)	E_{6(6)} / SL(6,R)×SL(2,R) or E_{6(6)} / SL(3,H)×SU(2)	E_{6(6)} / SO(5,5)×SO(1,1)	E_{6(6)} / F_{4(4)}
E_{6(2)}	E_{6(2)} / SU(6)×SU(2)	E_{6(2)} / Sp(3,1) or E_{6(2)} / Sp(8,R)	E_{6(2)} / SU(4,2)×SU(2) or E_{6(2)} / SU(3,3)×SL(2,R)	E_{6(2)} / SO(6,4)×SO(2) or E_{6(2)} / Sk(5,H)×SO(2)	E_{6(2)} / F_{4(4)}
E_{6(−14)}	E_{6(−14)} / SO(10)×SO(2)	E_{6(−14)} / Sp(2,2)	E_{6(−14)} / SU(4,2)×SU(2) or E_{6(−14)} / SU(5,1)×SL(2,R)	E_{6(−14)} / SO(8,2)×SO(2) or Sk(5,H)×SO(2)	E_{6(−14)} / F_{4(−20)}
E_{6(−26)}	E_{6(−26)} / F_{4}	E_{6(−26)} / Sp(3,1)	E_{6(−26)} / SL(3,H)×Sp(1)	E_{6(−26)} / SO(9,1)×SO(1,1)	E_{6(−26)} / F_{4(−20)}

E_{7}^{c}	–	E_{7}^{c} / SL(8,C)	E_{7}^{c} / SO(12,C)×Sp(2,C)	E_{7}^{c} / E_{6}^{c}×SO(2,C)
E_{7}	–	E_{7} / SU(8)	E_{7} / SO(12)×Sp(1)	E_{7} / E_{6}×SO(2)
E_{7(7)}	E_{7(7)} / SU(8)	E_{7(7)} / SU(4,4) or E_{7(7)} / SL(8,R) or E_{7(7)} / SL(4,H)	E_{7(7)} / SO(6,6)×SL(2,R) or E_{7(7)} / Sk(6,H)×Sp(1)	E_{7(7)} / E_{6(6)}×SO(1,1) or E_{7(7)} / E_{6(2)}×SO(2)
E_{7(−5)}	E_{7(−5)} / SO(12)×Sp(1)	E_{7(−5)} / SU(4,4) or E_{7(−5)} / SU(6,2)	E_{7(−5)} / SO(8,4)×SU(2) or E_{7(−5)} / Sk(6,H)×SL(2,R)	E_{7(−5)} / E_{6(2)}×SO(2) or E_{7(−5)} / E_{6(−14)}×SO(2)
E_{7(−25)}	E_{7(−25)} / E_{6}×SO(2)	E_{7(−25)} / SL(4,H) or E_{7(−25)} / SU(6,2)	E_{7(−25)} / SO(10,2)×SL(2,R) or E_{7(−25)} / Sk(6,H)×Sp(1)	E_{7(−25)} / E_{6(−14)}×SO(2) or E_{7(−25)} / E_{6(−26)}×SO(1,1)

E_{8}^{c}	–	E_{8}^{c} / SO(16,C)	E_{8}^{c} / E_{7}^{c}×Sp(2,C)
E_{8}	–	E_{8} / SO(16)	E_{8} / E_{7}×Sp(1)
E_{8(8)}	E_{8(8)} / SO(16)	E_{8(8)} / SO(8,8) or E_{8(8)} / Sk(8,H)	E_{8(8)} / E_{7(7)}×SL(2,R) or E_{8(8)} / E_{7(−5)}×SU(2)
E_{8(−24)}	E_{8(−24)} / E_{7}×Sp(1)	E_{8(−24)} / SO(12,4) or E_{8(−24)} / Sk(8,H)	E_{8(−24)} / E_{7(−5)}×SU(2) or E_{8(−24)} / E_{7(−25)}×SL(2,R)

== Weakly symmetric Riemannian spaces ==
In the 1950s Atle Selberg extended Cartan's definition of symmetric space to that of weakly symmetric Riemannian space, or in current terminology weakly symmetric space. These are defined as Riemannian manifolds M with a transitive connected Lie group of isometries G and an isometry σ normalising G such that given x, y in M there is an isometry s in G such that sx = σy and sy = σx. (Selberg's assumption that σ^{2} should be an element of G was later shown to be unnecessary by Ernest Vinberg.) Selberg proved that weakly symmetric spaces give rise to Gelfand pairs, so that in particular the unitary representation of G on L^{2}(M) is multiplicity free.

Selberg's definition can also be phrased equivalently in terms of a generalization of geodesic symmetry. It is required that for every point x in M and tangent vector X at x, there is an isometry s of M, depending on x and X, such that

- s fixes x;
- the derivative of s at x sends X to −X.

When s is independent of X, M is a symmetric space.

An account of weakly symmetric spaces and their classification by Akhiezer and Vinberg, based on the classification of periodic automorphisms of complex semisimple Lie algebras, is given in Wolf (2007).

== Properties ==
Some properties and forms of symmetric spaces can be noted.

=== Lifting the metric tensor ===
The metric tensor on the Riemannian manifold M can be lifted to a scalar product on G by combining it with the Killing form. This is done by defining

$$\langle X,Y\rangle_\mathfrak{g}=\begin{cases}
\langle X,Y\rangle_p \quad  & X,Y\in T_pM\cong \mathfrak{m}   \\
-B(X,Y)  \quad & X,Y\in \mathfrak{h} \\
0 & \mbox{otherwise}
\end{cases}$$

Here, $\langle\cdot,\cdot\rangle_p$ is the Riemannian metric defined on $T_pM$, and $B(X,Y)=\operatorname{trace} ( \operatorname{ad} X \circ \operatorname{ad} Y)$ is the Killing form. The minus sign appears because the Killing form is negative-definite on $\mathfrak{h}~;$ this makes $\langle \cdot,\cdot\rangle_\mathfrak{g}$ positive-definite.

=== Factorization ===
The tangent space $\mathfrak{m}$ can be further factored into eigenspaces classified by the Killing form. This is accomplished by defining an adjoint map $\mathfrak{m}\to\mathfrak{m}$ taking $Y\mapsto Y^\#$ as

$$\langle X,Y^\# \rangle = B(X,Y)$$

where $\langle \cdot,\cdot \rangle$ is the Riemannian metric on $\mathfrak{m}$ and $B(\cdot,\cdot)$ is the Killing form. This map is sometimes called the generalized transpose, as corresponds to the transpose for the orthogonal groups and the Hermitian conjugate for the unitary groups. It is a linear functional, and it is self-adjoint, and so one concludes that there is an orthonormal basis $Y_1,\ldots,Y_n$ of $\mathfrak{m}$ with

$$Y^\#_i=\lambda_iY_i$$

These are orthogonal with respect to the metric, in that

$$\langle Y^\#_i,Y_j \rangle = \lambda_i \langle Y_i,Y_j \rangle = B(Y_i,Y_j) = \langle Y^\#_j,Y_i \rangle = \lambda_j \langle Y_j,Y_i \rangle$$

since the Killing form is symmetric. This factorizes $\mathfrak{m}$ into eigenspaces

$$\mathfrak{m}=\mathfrak{m}_1\oplus\cdots\oplus\mathfrak{m}_d$$

with

$$[\mathfrak{m}_i,\mathfrak{m}_j]=0$$

for $i\ne j$. For the case of $\mathfrak{g}$ semisimple, so that the Killing form is non-degenerate, the metric likewise factorizes:

$$\langle\cdot,\cdot\rangle=\frac{1}{\lambda_1}\left.B\right|_{\mathfrak{m}_1}+\cdots +\frac{1}{\lambda_d}\left.B\right|_{\mathfrak{m}_d}$$

In certain practical applications, this factorization can be interpreted as the spectrum of operators, e.g. the spectrum of the hydrogen atom, with the eigenvalues of the Killing form corresponding to different values of the angular momentum of an orbital (i.e. the Killing form being a Casimir operator that can classify the different representations under which different orbitals transform.)

Classification of symmetric spaces proceeds based on whether or not the Killing form is definite.

== Applications and special cases ==
=== Symmetric spaces and holonomy ===
If the identity component of the holonomy group of a Riemannian manifold at a point acts irreducibly on the tangent space, then either the manifold is a locally Riemannian symmetric space, or it is in one of 7 families.

=== Hermitian symmetric spaces ===
A Riemannian symmetric space that is additionally equipped with a parallel complex structure compatible with the Riemannian metric is called a Hermitian symmetric space. Some examples are complex vector spaces and complex projective spaces, both with their usual Riemannian metric, and the complex unit balls with suitable metrics so that they become complete and Riemannian symmetric.

An irreducible symmetric space G / K is Hermitian if and only if K contains a central circle. A quarter turn by this circle acts as multiplication by i on the tangent space at the identity coset. Thus the Hermitian symmetric spaces are easily read off of the classification. In both the compact and the non-compact cases it turns out that there are four infinite series, namely AIII, BDI with p = 2, DIII and CI, and two exceptional spaces, namely EIII and EVII. The non-compact Hermitian symmetric spaces can be realized as bounded symmetric domains in complex vector spaces.

=== Quaternion-Kähler symmetric spaces ===
A Riemannian symmetric space that is additionally equipped with a parallel subbundle of End(TM) isomorphic to the imaginary quaternions at each point, and compatible with the Riemannian metric, is called quaternion-Kähler symmetric space.

An irreducible symmetric space G / K is quaternion-Kähler if and only if isotropy representation of K contains an Sp(1) summand acting like the unit quaternions on a quaternionic vector space. Thus the quaternion-Kähler symmetric spaces are easily read off from the classification. In both the compact and the non-compact cases it turns out that there is exactly one for each complex simple Lie group, namely AI with p = 2 or q = 2 (these are isomorphic), BDI with p = 4 or q = 4, CII with p = 1 or q = 1, EII, EVI, EIX, FI and G.

=== Bott periodicity theorem ===
In the Bott periodicity theorem, the loop spaces of the stable orthogonal group can be interpreted as reductive symmetric spaces.

== See also ==
- Orthogonal symmetric Lie algebra
- Relative root system
- Satake diagram
- Cartan involution
