= Bergstein (Hohe Loog) =

Coordinates: 49°20′02″N 8°06′51″E

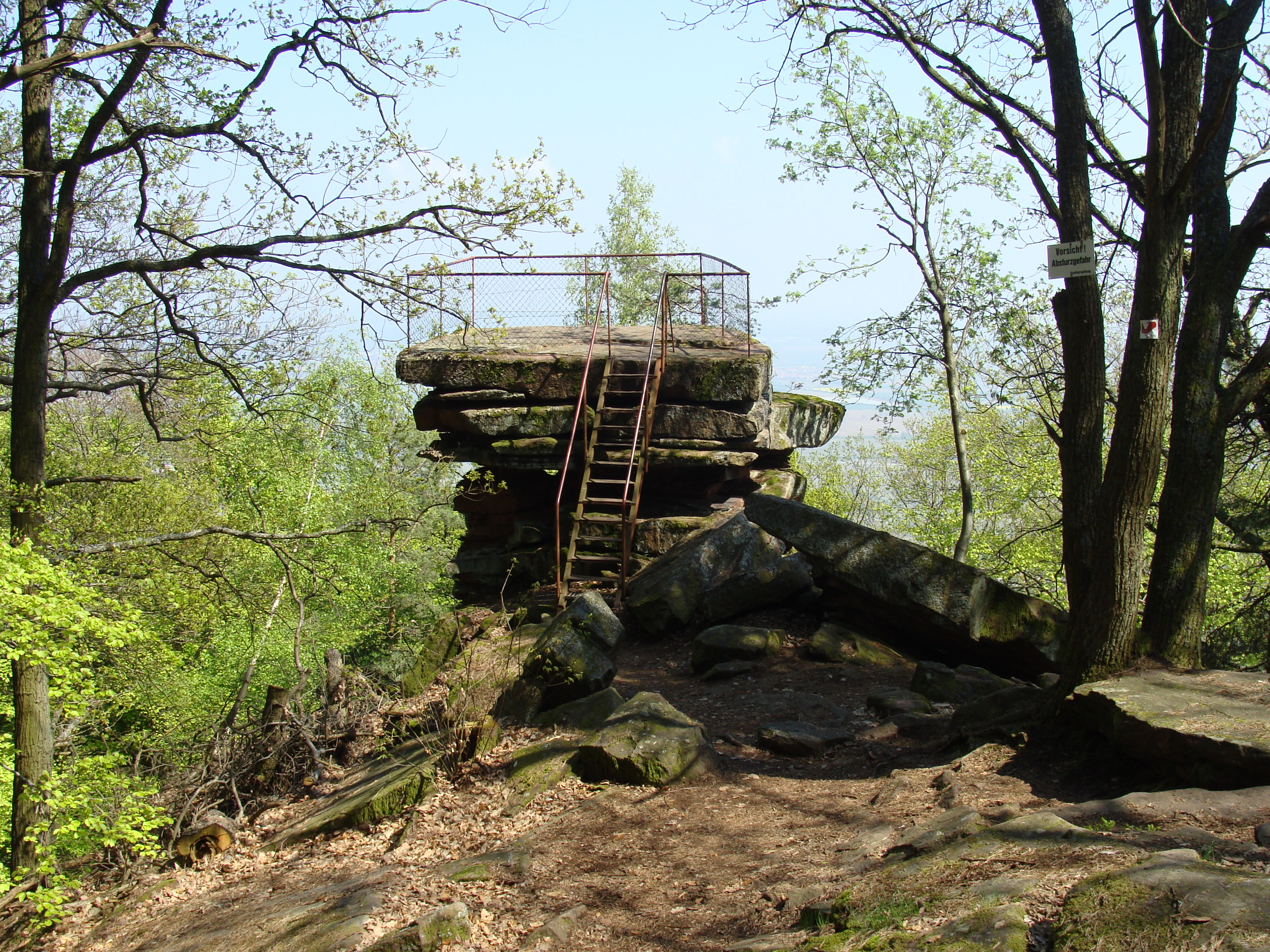
Bergstein on the Hohe Loog massif in the Palatinate Forest

The Bergstein is a natural monument in the borough of Neustadt an der Weinstraße in the German state of Rhineland-Palatinate. It is designated as ND-7316-202.

== Location ==
The Bergstein is described as a rock formation (Felspartie) and lies at an elevation of ca. 469 metres at the eastern edge of the Palatinate Forest and is part of the Hohe Loog massif. It lies about 300 metres southwest of the Trittbrunnen Way/Bergsteinstraße in the village of Hambach an der Weinstraße and is only accessible on foot. It has good views of Hambach Castle and the Rhine valley.
