= Triality =

Relationship between certain vector spaces

The automorphisms of the Dynkin diagram D_{4} give rise to triality in Spin(8).

In mathematics, triality is a relationship among three vector spaces, analogous to the duality relation between dual vector spaces. Most commonly, it describes those special features of the Dynkin diagram D_{4} and the associated Lie group Spin(8), the double cover of 8-dimensional rotation group SO(8), arising because the group has an outer automorphism of order three. There is a geometrical version of triality, analogous to duality in projective geometry.

Of all simple Lie groups, Spin(8) has the most symmetrical Dynkin diagram, D_{4}. The diagram has four nodes with one node located at the center, and the other three attached symmetrically. The symmetry group of the diagram is the symmetric group S_{3} which acts by permuting the three legs. This gives rise to an S_{3} group of outer automorphisms of Spin(8). This automorphism group permutes the three 8-dimensional irreducible representations of Spin(8); these being the vector representation and two chiral spin representations. These automorphisms do not project to automorphisms of SO(8). The vector representation—the natural action of SO(8) (hence Spin(8)) on F^{8}—consists over the real numbers of Euclidean 8-vectors and is generally known as the "defining module", while the chiral spin representations are also known as "half-spin representations", and all three of these are fundamental representations.

No other connected Dynkin diagram has an automorphism group of order greater than 2; for other D_{n} (corresponding to other even Spin groups, Spin(2n)), there is still the automorphism corresponding to switching the two half-spin representations, but these are not isomorphic to the vector representation.

Roughly speaking, symmetries of the Dynkin diagram lead to automorphisms of the Tits building associated with the group. For special linear groups, one obtains projective duality. For Spin(8), one finds a curious phenomenon involving 1-, 2-, and 4-dimensional subspaces of 8-dimensional space, historically known as "geometric triality".

The exceptional 3-fold symmetry of the D_{4} diagram also gives rise to the Steinberg group ^{3}D_{4}.

== General formulation ==
A duality between two vector spaces over a field F is a non-degenerate bilinear form

$$V_1\times V_2\to F,$$

i.e., for each non-zero vector v in one of the two vector spaces, the pairing with v is a non-zero linear functional on the other.

Similarly, a triality between three vector spaces over a field F is a non-degenerate trilinear form

$$V_1\times V_2\times V_3\to F,$$

i.e., each non-zero vector in one of the three vector spaces induces a duality between the other two.

By choosing vectors e_{i} in each V_{i} on which the trilinear form evaluates to 1, we find that the three vector spaces are all isomorphic to each other, and to their duals. Denoting this common vector space by V, the triality may be re-expressed as a bilinear multiplication

$$V \times V \to V$$

where each e_{i} corresponds to the identity element in V. The non-degeneracy condition now implies that V is a composition algebra. It follows that V has dimension 1, 2, 4 or 8. If further F = R and the form used to identify V with its dual is positive definite, then V is a Euclidean Hurwitz algebra, and is therefore isomorphic to R, C, H or O.

Conversely, composition algebras immediately give rise to trialities by taking each V_{i} equal to the algebra, and contracting the multiplication with the inner product on the algebra to make a trilinear form.

An alternative construction of trialities uses spinors in dimensions 1, 2, 4 and 8. The eight-dimensional case corresponds to the triality property of Spin(8).

== See also ==
- Triple product, may be related to the 4-dimensional triality (on quaternions)
