= 2E6 (mathematics) =

Family of groups in group theory

In mathematics, ^{2}E_{6} is a family of Steinberg or twisted Chevalley groups. It is a quasi-split form of E_{6}, depending on a quadratic extension of fields K⊂L. Unfortunately the notation for the group is not standardized, as some authors write it as ^{2}E_{6}(K) (thinking of ^{2}E_{6} as an algebraic group taking values in K) and some as ^{2}E_{6}(L) (thinking of the group as a subgroup of E_{6}(L) fixed by an outer involution).

Over finite fields these groups form one of the 18 infinite families of finite simple groups, and were introduced independently by Tits (1958) and Steinberg (1959).

== Over finite fields ==
The group ^{2}E_{6}(q^{2}) has order q^{36} (q^{12} − 1) (q^{9} + 1) (q^{8} − 1) (q^{6} − 1) (q^{5} + 1) (q^{2} − 1) /(3,q + 1). This is similar to the order q^{36} (q^{12} − 1) (q^{9} − 1) (q^{8} − 1) (q^{6} − 1) (q^{5} − 1) (q^{2} − 1) /(3,q − 1) of E_{6}(q).

Its Schur multiplier has order (3, q + 1) except for q=2, i. e. ^{2}E_{6}(2^{2}), when it has order 12 and is a product of cyclic groups of orders 2,2,3. One of the exceptional double covers of ^{2}E_{6}(2^{2}) is a subgroup of the baby monster group, and the exceptional central extension by the elementary abelian group of order 4 is a subgroup of the monster group.

The outer automorphism group has order (3, q + 1) · f where q^{2} = p^{f}.

== Over the real numbers ==
Over the real numbers, ^{2}E_{6} is the quasisplit form of E_{6}, and is one of the five real forms of E_{6} classified by Élie Cartan. Its maximal compact subgroup is of type F_{4}.
