= Chevalley basis =

In mathematics, a Chevalley basis for a simple complex Lie algebra is a basis constructed by Claude Chevalley with the property that all structure constants are integers. Chevalley used these bases to construct analogues of Lie groups over finite fields, called Chevalley groups. The Chevalley basis is the Cartan-Weyl basis, but with a different normalization.

The generators of a Lie group are split into the generators H and E indexed by simple roots and their negatives $\pm\alpha_i$. The Cartan-Weyl basis may be written as

$$[H_i,H_j]=0$$
$$[H_i,E_\alpha]=\alpha_i E_\alpha$$

Defining the dual root or coroot of $\alpha$ as

$$\alpha^\vee = \frac{2\alpha}{(\alpha,\alpha)}$$

where $(\cdot,\cdot)$ is the euclidean inner product. One may perform a change of basis to define

$$H_{\alpha_i}=(\alpha_i^\vee, H)$$

The Cartan integers are

$$A_{ij}=(\alpha_i,\alpha_j^\vee)$$

The resulting relations among the generators are the following:

$$[H_{\alpha_i},H_{\alpha_j}]=0$$
$$[H_{\alpha_i},E_{\alpha_j}]=A_{ji} E_{\alpha_j}$$
$$[E_{-\alpha_i},E_{\alpha_i}] = H_{\alpha_i}$$
$$[E_{\beta},E_{\gamma}]=\pm(p+1)E_{\beta+\gamma}$$

where in the last relation $p$ is the greatest positive integer such that $\gamma -p\beta$ is a root and we consider $E_{\beta + \gamma} = 0$ if $\beta + \gamma$ is not a root.

For determining the sign in the last relation one fixes an ordering of roots which respects addition, i.e., if $\beta \prec \gamma$ then $\beta + \alpha \prec \gamma + \alpha$ provided that all four are roots. We then call $(\beta, \gamma)$ an extraspecial pair of roots if they are both positive and $\beta$ is minimal among all $\beta_0$ that occur in pairs of positive roots $(\beta_0, \gamma_0)$ satisfying $\beta_0 + \gamma_0 = \beta + \gamma$. The sign in the last relation can be chosen arbitrarily whenever $(\beta, \gamma)$ is an extraspecial pair of roots. This then determines the signs for all remaining pairs of roots.
