= Group of Lie type =

Mathematical group

In mathematics, specifically in group theory, the phrase group of Lie type usually refers to finite groups that are closely related to the group of rational points of a reductive linear algebraic group with values in a finite field. The important collection of finite simple groups of Lie type make up most of the groups in the classification of finite simple groups.

The name "groups of Lie type" is due to the close relationship with the (infinite) Lie groups, since a compact Lie group may be viewed as the rational points of a reductive linear algebraic group over the field of real numbers. Dieudonné (1971) and Carter (1989) are standard references for groups of Lie type.

== Classical groups ==
An initial approach to this question was the definition and detailed study of the so-called classical groups over finite and other fields by Jordan (1870). These groups were studied by L. E. Dickson and Jean Dieudonné. Emil Artin investigated the orders of such groups, with a view to classifying cases of coincidence.

A classical group is, roughly speaking, a special linear, orthogonal, symplectic, or unitary group. There are several minor variations of these, given by taking derived subgroups or central quotients, the latter yielding projective linear groups. They can be constructed over finite fields (or any other field) in much the same way that they are constructed over the real numbers. They correspond to the series A_{n}, B_{n}, C_{n}, D_{n},^{2}A_{n}, ^{2}D_{n} of Chevalley and Steinberg groups.

== Chevalley groups ==
Chevalley groups can be thought of as Lie groups over finite fields. The theory was clarified by the theory of algebraic groups, and the work of Chevalley (1955) on Lie algebras, by means of which the Chevalley group concept was isolated. Chevalley constructed a Chevalley basis (a sort of integral form but over finite fields) for all the complex simple Lie algebras (or rather of their universal enveloping algebras), which can be used to define the corresponding algebraic groups over the integers. In particular, he could take their points with values in any finite field. For the Lie algebras A_{n}, B_{n}, C_{n}, D_{n} this gave well known classical groups, but his construction also gave groups associated to the exceptional Lie algebras E_{6}, E_{7}, E_{8}, F_{4}, and G_{2}. The ones of type G_{2} (sometimes called Dickson groups) had already been constructed by Dickson (1905), and the ones of type E_{6} by Dickson (1901).

== Steinberg groups ==
Chevalley's construction did not give all of the known classical groups: it omitted the unitary groups and the non-split orthogonal groups. Steinberg (1959) found a modification of Chevalley's construction that gave these groups and two new families ^{3}D_{4}, ^{2}E_{6}, the second of which was discovered at about the same time from a different point of view by Tits (1958). This construction generalizes the usual construction of the unitary group from the general linear group.

The unitary group arises as follows: the general linear group over the complex numbers has a diagram automorphism given by reversing the Dynkin diagram A_{n} (which corresponds to taking the transpose inverse), and a field automorphism given by taking complex conjugation, which commute. The unitary group is the group of fixed points of the product of these two automorphisms.

In the same way, many Chevalley groups have diagram automorphisms induced by automorphisms of their Dynkin diagrams, and field automorphisms induced by automorphisms of a finite field. Analogously to the unitary case, Steinberg constructed families of groups by taking fixed points of a product of a diagram and a field automorphism.

These gave:

- the unitary groups ^{2}A_{n}, from the order 2 automorphism of A_{n};
- further orthogonal groups ^{2}D_{n}, from the order 2 automorphism of D_{n};
- the new series ^{2}E_{6}, from the order 2 automorphism of E_{6};
- the new series ^{3}D_{4}, from the order 3 automorphism of D_{4}.

The groups of type ^{3}D_{4} have no analogue over the reals, as the complex numbers have no automorphism of order 3. The symmetries of the D_{4} diagram also give rise to triality.

== Suzuki–Ree groups ==
Suzuki (1960) found a new infinite series of groups that at first sight seemed unrelated to the known algebraic groups. Ree (1960, 1961) knew that the algebraic group B_{2} had an "extra" automorphism in characteristic 2 whose square was the Frobenius automorphism. He found that if a finite field of characteristic 2 also has an automorphism whose square was the Frobenius map, then an analogue of Steinberg's construction gave the Suzuki groups. The fields with such an automorphism are those of order 2^{2n+1}, and the corresponding groups are the Suzuki groups

^{2}B_{2}(2^{2n+1}) = Suz(2^{2n+1}).

(Strictly speaking, the group Suz(2) is not counted as a Suzuki group as it is not simple: it is the Frobenius group of order 20.) Ree was able to find two new similar families

^{2}F_{4}(2^{2n+1})

and

^{2}G_{2}(3^{2n+1})

of simple groups by using the fact that F_{4} and G_{2} have extra automorphisms in characteristic 2 and 3. (Roughly speaking, in characteristic p one is allowed to ignore the arrow on bonds of multiplicity p in the Dynkin diagram when taking diagram automorphisms.) The smallest group ^{2}F_{4}(2) of type ^{2}F_{4} is not simple, but it has a simple subgroup of index 2, called the Tits group (named after the mathematician Jacques Tits). The smallest group ^{2}G_{2}(3) of type ^{2}G_{2} is not simple, but it has a simple normal subgroup of index 3, isomorphic to A_{1}(8). In the classification of finite simple groups, the Ree groups

^{2}G_{2}(3^{2n+1})

are the ones whose structure is hardest to pin down explicitly. These groups also played a role in the discovery of the first modern sporadic group. They have involution centralizers of the form Z/2Z × PSL(2, q) for q = 3^{n}, and by investigating groups with an involution centralizer of the similar form Z/2Z × PSL(2, 5) Janko found the sporadic group J_{1}.

The Suzuki groups are the only finite non-abelian simple groups with order not divisible by 3. They have order 2^{2(2n+1)}(2^{2(2n+1)} + 1)(2^{(2n+1)} − 1).

== Relations with finite simple groups ==
Finite groups of Lie type were among the first groups to be considered in mathematics, after cyclic, symmetric and alternating groups, with the projective special linear groups over prime finite fields, PSL(2, p) being constructed by Évariste Galois in the 1830s. The systematic exploration of finite groups of Lie type started with Camille Jordan's theorem that the projective special linear group PSL(2, q) is simple for q ≠ 2, 3. This theorem generalizes to projective groups of higher dimensions and gives an important infinite family PSL(n, q) of finite simple groups. Other classical groups were studied by Leonard Dickson in the beginning of 20th century. In the 1950s Claude Chevalley realized that after an appropriate reformulation, many theorems about semisimple Lie groups admit analogues for algebraic groups over an arbitrary field k, leading to construction of what are now called Chevalley groups. Moreover, as in the case of compact simple Lie groups, the corresponding groups turned out to be almost simple as abstract groups (Tits simplicity theorem). Although it was known since 19th century that other finite simple groups exist (for example, Mathieu groups), gradually a belief formed that nearly all finite simple groups can be accounted for by appropriate extensions of Chevalley's construction, together with cyclic and alternating groups. Moreover, the exceptions, the sporadic groups, share many properties with the finite groups of Lie type, and in particular, can be constructed and characterized based on their geometry in the sense of Tits.

The belief has now become a theorem – the classification of finite simple groups. Inspection of the list of finite simple groups shows that groups of Lie type over a finite field include all the finite simple groups other than the cyclic groups, the alternating groups, the Tits group, and the 26 sporadic simple groups.

== Small groups of Lie type ==
In general the finite group associated to an endomorphism of a simply connected simple algebraic group is the universal central extension of a simple group, so is perfect and has trivial Schur multiplier. However some of the smallest groups in the families above are either not perfect or have a Schur multiplier larger than "expected".

Cases where the group is not perfect include

- A_{1}(2) = SL(2, 2) Solvable of order 6 (the symmetric group on 3 points)
- A_{1}(3) = PSL(2, 3) Solvable of order 12 (the alternating group on 4 points)
- ^{2}A_{2}(4) Solvable
- B_{2}(2) Not perfect, but is isomorphic to the symmetric group on 6 points so its derived subgroup has index 2 and is simple of order 360.
- ^{2}B_{2}(2) = Suz(2) Solvable of order 20 (a Frobenius group)
- ^{2}F_{4}(2) Not perfect, but the derived group has index 2 and is the simple Tits group.
- G_{2}(2) Not perfect, but the derived group has index 2 and is simple of order 6048.
- ^{2}G_{2}(3) Not perfect, but the derived group has index 3 and is the simple group of order 504.

Some cases where the group is perfect but has a Schur multiplier that is larger than expected include:

- A_{1}(4) The Schur multiplier has an extra Z/2Z, so the Schur multiplier of the simple group has order 2 instead of 1.
- A_{1}(9) The Schur multiplier has an extra Z/3Z, so the Schur multiplier of the simple group has order 6 instead of 2.
- A_{2}(2) The Schur multiplier has an extra Z/2Z, so the Schur multiplier of the simple group has order 2 instead of 1.
- A_{2}(4) The Schur multiplier has an extra Z/4Z × Z/4Z, so the Schur multiplier of the simple group has order 48 instead of 3.
- A_{3}(2) The Schur multiplier has an extra Z/2Z, so the Schur multiplier of the simple group has order 2 instead of 1.
- B_{3}(2) = C_{3}(2) The Schur multiplier has an extra Z/2Z, so the Schur multiplier of the simple group has order 2 instead of 1.
- B_{3}(3) The Schur multiplier has an extra Z/3Z, so the Schur multiplier of the simple group has order 6 instead of 2.
- D_{4}(2) The Schur multiplier has an extra Z/2Z × Z/2Z, so the Schur multiplier of the simple group has order 4 instead of 1.
- F_{4}(2) The Schur multiplier has an extra Z/2Z, so the Schur multiplier of the simple group has order 2 instead of 1.
- G_{2}(3) The Schur multiplier has an extra Z/3Z, so the Schur multiplier of the simple group has order 3 instead of 1.
- G_{2}(4) The Schur multiplier has an extra Z/2Z, so the Schur multiplier of the simple group has order 2 instead of 1.
- ^{2}A_{3}(4) The Schur multiplier has an extra Z/2Z, so the Schur multiplier of the simple group has order 2 instead of 1.
- ^{2}A_{3}(9) The Schur multiplier has an extra Z/3Z × Z/3Z, so the Schur multiplier of the simple group has order 36 instead of 4.
- ^{2}A_{5}(4) The Schur multiplier has an extra Z/2Z × Z/2Z, so the Schur multiplier of the simple group has order 12 instead of 3.
- ^{2}E_{6}(4) The Schur multiplier has an extra Z/2Z × Z/2Z, so the Schur multiplier of the simple group has order 12 instead of 3.
- ^{2}B_{2}(8) The Schur multiplier has an extra Z/2Z × Z/2Z, so the Schur multiplier of the simple group has order 4 instead of 1.

There is a bewildering number of "accidental" isomorphisms between various small groups of Lie type (and alternating groups). For example, the groups SL(2, 4), PSL(2, 5), and the alternating group on 5 points are all isomorphic.

For a complete list of these exceptions see the list of finite simple groups. Many of these special properties are related to certain sporadic simple groups.

Alternating groups sometimes behave as if they were groups of Lie type over the field with one element. Some of the small alternating groups also have exceptional properties. The alternating groups usually have an outer automorphism group of order 2, but the alternating group on 6 points has an outer automorphism group of order 4. Alternating groups usually have a Schur multiplier of order 2, but the ones on 6 or 7 points have a Schur multiplier of order 6.

== Notation issues ==
There is no standard notation for the finite groups of Lie type, and the literature contains dozens of incompatible and confusing systems of notation for them.

- The simple group PSL(n, q) is not usually the same as the group PSL(n, F_{q}) of F_{q}-valued points of the algebraic group PSL(n). The problem is that a surjective map of algebraic groups such as SL(n) → PSL(n) does not necessarily induce a surjective map of the corresponding groups with values in some (non algebraically closed) field. There are similar problems with the points of other algebraic groups with values in finite fields.
- The groups of type A_{n−1} are sometimes denoted by PSL(n, q) (the projective special linear group) or by L(n, q).
- The groups of type C_{n} are sometimes denoted by Sp(2n, q) (the symplectic group) or (confusingly) by Sp(n, q).
- The notation for groups of type D_{n} ("orthogonal" groups) is particularly confusing. Some symbols used are O(n, q), O^{−}(n, q), PSO(n, q), Ω_{n}(q), but there are so many conventions that it is not possible to say exactly what groups these correspond to without it being specified explicitly. The source of the problem is that the simple group is not the orthogonal group O, nor the projective special orthogonal group PSO, but rather a subgroup of PSO, which accordingly does not have a classical notation. A particularly nasty trap is that some authors, such as the ATLAS, use O(n, q) for a group that is not the orthogonal group, but the corresponding simple group. The notation Ω, PΩ was introduced by Jean Dieudonné, though his definition is not simple for n ≤ 4 and thus the same notation may be used for a slightly different group, which agrees in n ≥ 5 but not in lower dimension.
- For the Steinberg groups, some authors write ^{2}A_{n}(q^{2}) (and so on) for the group that other authors denote by ^{2}A_{n}(q). The problem is that there are two fields involved, one of order q^{2}, and its fixed field of order q, and people have different ideas on which should be included in the notation. The "^{2}A_{n}(q^{2})" convention is more logical and consistent, but the "^{2}A_{n}(q)" convention is far more common and is closer to the convention for algebraic groups.
- Authors differ on whether groups such as A_{n}(q) are the groups of points with values in the simple or the simply connected algebraic group. For example, A_{n}(q) may mean either the special linear group SL(n+1, q) or the projective special linear group PSL(n+1, q). So ^{2}A_{2}(4) may be any one of 4 different groups, depending on the author.

== See also ==
- Deligne–Lusztig theory (representation theory of finite groups of Lie type)
- Modular Lie algebra
