= Motor variable =

Mathematical functions of split-complex numbers

In mathematics, a function of a motor variable is a function with arguments and values in the split-complex number plane, much as functions of a complex variable involve ordinary complex numbers. William Kingdon Clifford coined the term motor for a kinematic operator in his "Preliminary Sketch of Biquaternions" (1873). He used split-complex numbers for scalars in his split-biquaternions. Motor variable is used here in place of split-complex variable for euphony and tradition.

For example,

$$f(z) = u(z) + j \ v(z) ,\ z = x + j y ,\ x,y \in R ,\quad j^2 = +1,\quad u(z),v(z) \in R.$$

Functions of a motor variable provide a context to extend real analysis and provide compact representation of mappings of the plane. However, the theory falls well short of function theory on the ordinary complex plane. Nevertheless, some of the aspects of conventional complex analysis have an interpretation given with motor variables, and more generally in hypercomplex analysis.

== Elementary functions ==
Let D = $\{ z = x + jy : x,y \in R \}$, the split-complex plane. The following exemplar functions f have domain and range in D:

The action of a hyperbolic versor $u = \exp(aj) = \cosh a + j \sinh a$ is combined with translation to produce the affine transformation

$f(z) = uz + c \$. When c = 0, the function is equivalent to a squeeze mapping.

The squaring function has no analogy in ordinary complex arithmetic. Let

$f(z) = z^2 \$ and note that $f(-1)=f(j)= f(-j) = 1. \$

The result is that the four quadrants are mapped into one, the identity component:

$U_1 = \{z \in D : \mid y \mid < x \}$, and there are four square roots for elements of this component but no square roots for elements of the other three components.

Note that $z z^* = 1 \$ forms the unit hyperbola $x^2 - y^2 = 1$. Thus, the reciprocation

$$f(z) = 1/z = z^*/\mid z \mid^2 \text{where} \mid z \mid^2 = z z^*$$

involves the hyperbola as curve of reference as opposed to the circle in C.

== Linear fractional transformations ==
Using the concept of a projective line over a ring, the projective line P(D) is formed. The construction uses homogeneous coordinates with split-complex number components. The projective line P(D) is transformed by linear fractional transformations:

$$[z:1]\begin{pmatrix}a & c \\ b & d \end{pmatrix} = [az + b : cz + d] ,$$
sometimes written
$f(z) = \frac {az + b} {cz + d},$ provided cz + d is a unit in D.

Elementary linear fractional transformations include

- hyperbolic rotations
  $$\begin{pmatrix}u & 0 \\ 0 & 1 \end{pmatrix},$$
- translations
  $$\begin{pmatrix}1 & 0 \\ t & 1 \end{pmatrix},$$
  and
- the inversion
  $$\begin{pmatrix}0 & 1 \\ 1 & 0 \end{pmatrix}.$$

Each of these has an inverse, and compositions fill out a group of linear fractional transformations. The motor variable is characterized by hyperbolic angle in its polar coordinates, and this angle is preserved by motor variable linear fractional transformations just as circular angle is preserved by the Möbius transformations of the ordinary complex plane. Transformations preserving angles are called conformal, so linear fractional transformations are conformal maps.

Transformations bounding regions can be compared: For example, on the ordinary complex plane, the Cayley transform carries the upper half-plane to the unit disk, thus bounding it. A mapping of the identity component U_{1} of D into a rectangle provides a comparable bounding action:

$$f(z) = \frac {1}{z + 1/2}, \quad f:U_1 \to T$$

where T = {z = x + jy : |y| < x < 1 or |y| < 2 – x when 1 ≤ x <2}.

To realize the linear fractional transformations as bijections on the projective line a compactification of D is used. See the section given below.

== Exp, log, and square root ==
The exponential function carries the whole plane D into U_{1}:

$$e^x = \sum_{n=0}^\infty {x^n \over n!} = \sum_{n=0}^\infty \frac {x^{2n}} {(2n)!} + \sum_{n=0}^\infty \frac {x^{2n+1}} {(2n+1)!} = \cosh x + \sinh x$$.

Thus when x = bj, then e^{x} is a hyperbolic versor. For the general motor variable z = a + bj, one has

$$e^z = e^a (\cosh b + j \  \sinh b) \$$.

In the theory of functions of a motor variable special attention should be called to the square root and logarithm functions. In particular, the plane of split-complex numbers consists of four connected components $\{U_1, -U_1, jU_1, -jU_1\},$ and the set of singular points that have no inverse: the diagonals z = x ± x j, x ∈ R. The identity component, namely {z : x > |y| } = U_{1}, is the range of the squaring function and the exponential. Thus it is the domain of the square root and logarithm functions. The other three quadrants do not belong in the domain because square root and logarithm are defined as one-to-one inverses of the squaring function and the exponential function.

Graphic description of the logarithm of D is given by Motter & Rosa in their article "Hyperbolic Calculus" (1998).

== D-holomorphic functions ==
The Cauchy–Riemann equations that characterize holomorphic functions on a domain in the complex plane have an analogue for functions of a motor variable. An approach to D-holomorphic functions using a Wirtinger derivative was given by Motter & Rossa:

The function f = u + j v is called D-holomorphic when

$$0 \ = \ \left({\partial \over \partial x} - j {\partial \over \partial y}\right) (u + j v) = \ u_x - j^2 v_y + j (v_x - u_y).$$

By considering real and imaginary components, a D-holomorphic function satisfies

$$u_x = v_y, \quad v_x = u_y.$$

These equations were published in 1893 by Georg Scheffers, so they have been called Scheffers' conditions.

The comparable approach in harmonic function theory can be viewed in a text by Peter Duren. It is apparent that the components u and v of a D-holomorphic function f satisfy the wave equation, associated with D'Alembert, whereas components of C-holomorphic functions satisfy Laplace's equation.

== La Plata lessons ==
At the National University of La Plata in 1935, J.C. Vignaux, an expert in convergence of infinite series, contributed four articles on the motor variable to the university's annual periodical. He is the sole author of the introductory one, and consulted with his department head A. Durañona y Vedia on the others. In "Sobre las series de numeros complejos hiperbolicos" he says (p. 123):

This system of hyperbolic complex numbers [motor variables] is the direct sum of two fields isomorphic to the field of real numbers; this property permits explication of the theory of series and of functions of the hyperbolic complex variable through the use of properties of the field of real numbers.

He then proceeds, for example, to generalize theorems due to Cauchy, Abel, Mertens, and Hardy to the domain of the motor variable.

In the primary article, cited below, he considers D-holomorphic functions, and the satisfaction of d’Alembert's equation by their components. He calls a rectangle with sides parallel to the diagonals y = x and y = − x, an isotropic rectangle since its sides are on isotropic lines. He concludes his abstract with these words:

Isotropic rectangles play a fundamental role in this theory since they form the domains of existence for holomorphic functions, domains of convergence of power series, and domains of convergence of functional series.

Vignaux completed his series with a six-page note on the approximation of D-holomorphic functions in a unit isotropic rectangle by Bernstein polynomials. While there are some typographical errors as well as a couple of technical stumbles in this series, Vignaux succeeded in laying out the main lines of the theory that lies between real and ordinary complex analysis. The text is especially impressive as an instructive document for students and teachers due to its exemplary development from elements. Furthermore, the entire excursion is rooted in "its relation to Émile Borel’s geometry" so as to underwrite its motivation.

== Bireal variable ==
In 1892 Corrado Segre recalled the tessarine algebra as bicomplex numbers. Naturally the subalgebra of real tessarines arose and came to be called the bireal numbers.

In 1946 U. Bencivenga published an essay on the dual numbers and the split-complex numbers where he used the term bireal number. He also described some of the function theory of the bireal variable. The essay was studied at University of British Columbia in 1949 when Geoffrey Fox wrote his master's thesis "Elementary function theory of a hypercomplex variable and the theory of conformal mapping in the hyperbolic plane". On page 46 Fox reports "Bencivenga has shown that a function of a bireal variable maps the hyperbolic plane into itself in such a manner that, at those points for which the derivative of a function exists and does not vanish, hyperbolic angles are preserved in the mapping".

G. Fox proceeds to provide the polar decomposition of a bireal variable and discusses hyperbolic orthogonality. Starting from a different definition he proves on page 57

Theorem 3.42 : Two vectors are mutually orthogonal if and only if their unit vectors are mutually reflections of one another in one or another of the diagonal lines through 0.

Fox focuses on "bilinear transformations" $w = \frac {\alpha z + \beta} {\gamma z + \delta}$, where $\alpha, \beta, \gamma, \delta$ are bireal constants. To cope with singularity he augments the plane with a single point at infinity (page 73).

Among his novel contributions to function theory is the concept of an interlocked system. Fox shows that for a bireal k satisfying

(a − b)^{2} < |k| < (a + b)^{2}

the hyperbolas

|z| = a^{2} and |z − k| = b^{2}

do not intersect (form an interlocked system). He then shows that this property is preserved by bilinear transformations of a bireal variable.

== Compactification ==
The multiplicative inverse function is so important that extreme measures are taken to include it in the mappings of differential geometry. For instance, the complex plane is rolled up to the Riemann sphere for ordinary complex arithmetic. For split-complex arithmetic a hyperboloid is used instead of a sphere: $H = \{(x, y, z) : z^2 + x^2 - y^2 = 1 \} .$ As with the Riemann sphere, the method is stereographic projection from P = (0, 0, 1) through t = (x, y, 0) to the hyperboloid. The line L = Pt is parametrized by s in $L = \{ (s x, s y, 1 - s) : s \in R \}$ so that it passes P when s is zero and t when s is one.

From H ∩ L it follows that

$$(1 - s)^2 + (sx)^2 - (sy)^2 = 1 , \text{ so that} \quad s = \frac {2}{1 + x^2 - y^2} .$$

If t is on the null cone, then s = 2 and (2x, ±2x, – 1) is on H, the opposite points (2x, ±2x, 1) make up the light cone at infinity that is the image of the null cone under inversion.

Note that for t with $y^2 > 1 + x^2 ,$ s is negative. The implication is that the back-ray through P to t provides the point on H. These points t are above and below the hyperbola conjugate to the unit hyperbola.

The compactification must be completed in P^{3}R with homogeneous coordinates (w, x, y, z) where w = 1 specifies the affine space (x, y, z) used so far. Hyperboloid H is absorbed into the projective conic $\{ (w, x, y, z) \in P^3R : z^2 + x^2 = y^2 + w^2 \},$ which is a compact space.

Walter Benz performed the compactification by using a mapping due to Hans Beck. Isaak Yaglom illustrated a two-step compactification as above, but with the split-complex plane tangent to the hyperboloid. In 2015 Emanuello & Nolder performed the compactification by first embedding the motor plane into a torus, and then making it projective by identifying antipodal points.
