= Griffith Baley Price =

American mathematician

G. Baley Price (14 March 1905, Brookhaven, Mississippi – 7 November 2006, Lawrence, Kansas) was an American mathematician and historian of American mathematics. He was a president of the Mathematical Association of America.

== Career ==
After graduating with an A.B. from Mississippi College in 1925, G. B. Price went to Harvard University, where he received his M.A. in 1928 and his Ph.D. in 1932 under G. D. Birkhoff with thesis Double Pendulum and Similar Dynamical Systems. Apart from a period of service with the U.S. Army Air Force in England in World War II, Price was a mathematics professor at the University of Kansas from 1937 to 1975 and chair of the mathematics department from 1951 to 1970. John L. Kelley recalled Price's assistance when Kelley refused a loyalty oath at Berkeley.

Price was the co-author of two textbooks (published in 1966 and 1968), the author of a history of the department of mathematics of the University of Kansas and several articles related to the role of mathematics and mathematicians in World War II. He was president of the Mathematical Association of America (MAA) for the two years 1957–1958 and received the MAA's distinguished service award in 1970.

Price based his book about multicomplex spaces and functions on Corrado Segre's work where $\Complex_n$ has n imaginary units $i_1, \ i_2, \dots, i_n$ all of which commute. But the book primarily treats bicomplex numbers $\Complex_2 \ .$

Since $(i_1 i_2)^2 = +1$ the numbers $e_1 = \tfrac{1}{2}(1 + i_1i_2)$ and $e_2 = \tfrac{1}{2}(1 - i_1i_2)$ are idempotent. The idempotents provide an alternate basis for the bicomplexes:

$z_1 + z_2 i_2 = (z_1 - i_1 z_2)e_1 + (z_1 + i_1 z_2)e_2 .$ (page 19)

Differentiable bicomplex functions f are shown to correspond to a pair of differentiable complex functions f_{1} and f_{2}:

$f(z_1-i_1z_2) = f_1(z_1-i_1z_2)e_1 + f_2(z_1+i_1z_2)e_2 .$ (page 131)

== Works ==
- 1935: "On reversible dynamical systems", Transactions of the American Mathematical Society 37(1): 51–59, doi:10.1090/s0002-9947-1935-1501778-0, MR 1501778
- 1947: "Some identities in the theory of determinants", American Mathematical Monthly 54:75–90, MR 0019078 Zbl 0029.00210
- 1951: "Bounds for determinants with dominant principal diagonal", Proceedings of the American Mathematical Society 2: 497–502, doi:10.1090/s0002-9939-1951-0041093-2, MR 0041093
- 1976: History of the department of mathematics at the University of Kansas, 1866–1970. Lawrence, Kansas: K. U. Endowment Association, U. of Kansas. 1976; xii+788 p., link from Google Books
- 1984: Multivariable analysis. NY: Springer-Verlag. 11 June 1984. ISBN 0387909346; xiv+655 p.
- 1988: "American Mathematicians in World War I", pages 267–73 in A Century of Mathematics In America Part I, Peter Duren editor, American Mathematical Society ISBN 0-8218-0124-4
- 1991: An introduction to multicomplex spaces and functions. NY: Marcel Dekker. 23 October 1990. ISBN 082478345X; xiii+402 p.
