= Zorn's Law =

- Zorn's law is a maxim coined by Chicago Tribune columnist Eric Zorn as an English Wikipedia prank. It stated that, in any debate, the first person to hurl the insult, "get a life!" is the loser.
- Zorn's lemma is a proposition used in many areas of theoretical mathematics.
