= Lie theory =

Study of Lie groups, Lie algebras and differential equations

In mathematics, the mathematician Sophus Lie (/liː/ LEE) initiated lines of study involving integration of differential equations, automorphism groups and contact of spheres that have come to be called Lie theory. For instance, the latter subject is Lie sphere geometry. This article addresses his approach to transformation groups, which is one of the areas of mathematics, and was worked out by Wilhelm Killing and Élie Cartan.

The foundation of Lie theory is the exponential map relating Lie algebras to Lie groups which is called the Lie group–Lie algebra correspondence. The subject is part of differential geometry since Lie groups are differentiable manifolds. Lie groups evolve out of the identity (1) and the tangent vectors to one-parameter subgroups generate the Lie algebra. The structure of a Lie group is implicit in its algebra, and the structure of the Lie algebra is expressed by root systems and root data.

Lie theory has been particularly useful in mathematical physics since it describes the standard transformation groups: the Galilean group, the Lorentz group, the Poincaré group and the conformal group of spacetime.

== Elementary Lie theory ==
The one-parameter groups are the first instance of Lie theory. The compact case arises through Euler's formula in the complex plane. Other one-parameter groups occur in the split-complex number plane as the unit hyperbola

$$\lbrace \exp(j t) = \cosh(t) + j \sinh(t) : t \in R \rbrace,\quad j^2 = +1$$

and in the dual number plane as the line $\lbrace \exp(\varepsilon t) = 1 + \varepsilon t : t \in R \rbrace \quad \varepsilon^2 = 0.$ In these cases the Lie algebra parameters have names: angle, hyperbolic angle, and slope. These species of angle are useful for providing polar decompositions which describe the planar subalgebras of 2 x 2 real matrices.

There is a classical 3-parameter Lie group and algebra pair: the quaternions of unit length which can be identified with the 3-sphere. Its Lie algebra is the subspace of quaternion vectors. Since the commutator ij − ji = 2k, the Lie bracket in this algebra is twice the cross product of ordinary vector analysis.

Another elementary 3-parameter example is given by the Heisenberg group and its Lie algebra. Standard treatments of Lie theory often begin with the classical groups.

== History and scope ==
Early expressions of Lie theory are found in books composed by Sophus Lie with Friedrich Engel and Georg Scheffers from 1888 to 1896.

In Lie's early work, the idea was to construct a theory of continuous groups, to complement the theory of discrete groups that had developed in the theory of modular forms, in the hands of Felix Klein and Henri Poincaré. The initial application that Lie had in mind was to the theory of differential equations. On the model of Galois theory and polynomial equations, the driving conception was of a theory capable of unifying, by the study of symmetry, the whole area of ordinary differential equations.

According to Thomas W. Hawkins Jr., it was Élie Cartan who made Lie theory what it is:

While Lie had many fertile ideas, Cartan was primarily responsible for the extensions and applications of his theory that have made it a basic component of modern mathematics. It was he who, with some help from Weyl, developed the seminal, essentially algebraic ideas of Killing into the theory of the structure and representation of semisimple Lie algebras that plays such a fundamental role in present-day Lie theory. And although Lie envisioned applications of his theory to geometry, it was Cartan who actually created them, for example through his theories of symmetric and generalized spaces, including all the attendant apparatus (moving frames, exterior differential forms, etc.)

== Lie's three theorems ==
In his work on transformation groups, Sophus Lie proved three theorems relating the groups and algebras that bear his name. The first theorem exhibited the basis of an algebra through infinitesimal transformations. The second theorem exhibited structure constants of the algebra as the result of commutator products in the algebra. The third theorem showed these constants are anti-symmetric and satisfy the Jacobi identity. As Robert Gilmore wrote:

Lie's three theorems provide a mechanism for constructing the Lie algebra associated with any Lie group. They also characterize the properties of a Lie algebra. ¶ The converses of Lie’s three theorems do the opposite: they supply a mechanism for associating a Lie group with any finite dimensional Lie algebra ... Taylor's theorem allows for the construction of a canonical analytic structure function φ(β,α) from the Lie algebra. ¶ These seven theorems – the three theorems of Lie and their converses, and Taylor's theorem – provide an essential equivalence between Lie groups and algebras.

== Aspects of Lie theory ==
Lie theory is frequently built upon a study of the classical linear algebraic groups. Special branches include Weyl groups, Coxeter groups, and buildings. The classical subject has been extended to Groups of Lie type.

In 1900 David Hilbert challenged Lie theorists with his Fifth Problem presented at the International Congress of Mathematicians in Paris.

== See also ==
- Baker–Campbell–Hausdorff formula
- Glossary of Lie groups and Lie algebras
- List of Lie groups topics
- Lie group integrator

== Notes and references ==
- John A. Coleman (1989) "The Greatest Mathematical Paper of All Time", The Mathematical Intelligencer 11(3): 29–38.
