= Indefinite orthogonal group =

Orthogonal group of an indefinite quadratic form

In mathematics, the indefinite orthogonal group, $\operatorname{O}(p,q)$ is the Lie group of all linear transformations of an $n$-dimensional real vector space that leave invariant a nondegenerate, symmetric bilinear form of signature $(p,q)$, where $n=p+q$. It is also called the pseudo-orthogonal group or generalized orthogonal group. The dimension of the group is $n(n-1)/2$.

The indefinite special orthogonal group, $\operatorname{SO}(p,q)$ is the subgroup of $\operatorname{O}(p,q)$ consisting of all elements with determinant $1$. Unlike in the definite case, $\operatorname{SO}(p,q)$ is not connected – it has 2 components – and there are two additional finite index subgroups, namely the connected $\operatorname{SO}^+(p,q)$ and $\operatorname{O}^+(p,q)$, which has 2 components – see § Topology for definition and discussion.

The signature of the form determines the group up to isomorphism; interchanging $p$ with $q$ amounts to replacing the metric by its negative, and so gives the same group. If either $p$ or $q$ equals zero, then the group is isomorphic to the ordinary orthogonal group $\operatorname{O}(n)$. We assume in what follows that both $p$ and $q$ are positive.

The group $\operatorname{O}(p,q)$ is defined for vector spaces over the reals. On complex spaces, all nondegenerate symmetric bilinear forms are the same up to change of coordinates; however, one can define the indefinite unitary group $\operatorname{U}(p,q)$ which preserves a sesquilinear form of signature $(p,q)$.

In even dimension $n=2p$, $\operatorname{O}(p,p)$ is known as the split orthogonal group.

== Examples ==
Squeeze mappings, here $r=3/2$, are the basic hyperbolic symmetries.

The basic example is the squeeze mappings, which is the group $\operatorname{SO}^+(1,1)$ of (the identity component of) linear transforms preserving the unit hyperbola. Concretely, these are the matrices $\left[\begin{smallmatrix} \cosh(\alpha) & \sinh(\alpha) \\ \sinh(\alpha) & \cosh(\alpha) \end{smallmatrix}\right],$ and can be interpreted as hyperbolic rotations, just as the group $\operatorname{SO}(2)$ can be interpreted as circular rotations.

In physics, the Lorentz group $\operatorname{O}(1,3)$ is of central importance, being the setting for electromagnetism and special relativity. (Some texts use $\operatorname{O}(3,1)$ for the Lorentz group; however, $\operatorname{O}(1,3)$ is prevalent in quantum field theory because the geometric properties of the Dirac equation are more natural in $\operatorname{O}(1,3)$.)

== Matrix definition ==
One can define $\operatorname{O}(p,q)$ as a group of matrices, just as for the classical orthogonal group $\operatorname{O}(n)$. Consider the $(p+q)\times(p+q)$ diagonal matrix $g$ given by
$$g = \mathrm{diag}(\underbrace{1,\ldots,1}_{p},\underbrace{-1,\ldots,-1}_{q}).$$
Then we may define a symmetric bilinear form $[\cdot,\cdot]_{p,q}$ on $\mathbb R^{p+q}$ by the formula
$$[x,y]_{p,q}=\langle x,gy\rangle=x_1y_1+\cdots +x_py_p-x_{p+1}y_{p+1}-\cdots -x_{p+q}y_{p+q},$$
where $\langle\cdot,\cdot\rangle$ is the standard inner product on $\mathbb R^{p+q}$.

We then define $\mathrm{O}(p,q)$ to be the group of $(p+q)\times(p+q)$ matrices that preserve this bilinear form:
$$\mathrm{O}(p,q)=\{A\in M_{p+q}(\mathbb R):[Ax,Ay]_{p,q}=[x,y]_{p,q}\,\forall x,y\in\mathbb R^{p+q}\}.$$

More explicitly, $\mathrm{O}(p,q)$ consists of matrices $A$ such that
$$gA^Tg = A^{-1},$$
where $A^T$ is the transpose of $A$.

One obtains an isomorphic group (indeed, a conjugate subgroup of $\operatorname{GL}(p+q)$) by replacing $g$ with any symmetric matrix with $p$ positive eigenvalues and $q$ negative ones. Diagonalizing this matrix gives a conjugation of this group with the standard group $\operatorname{O}(p,q)$.

=== Subgroups ===
The group $\operatorname{SO}^+(p,q)$ and related subgroups of $\operatorname{O}(p,q)$ can be described algebraically. Partition a matrix $L$ in $\operatorname{O}(p,q)$ as a block matrix:
$$L = \begin{pmatrix}
A & B \\
C & D
\end{pmatrix}$$
where $A$, $B$, $C$, and $D$ are $p\times p$, $p\times q$, $q\times p$, and $q\times q$ blocks, respectively. It can be shown that the set of matrices in $\operatorname{O}(p,q)$ whose upper-left $p\times p$ block $A$ has positive determinant is a subgroup. Or, to put it another way, if
$$L = \begin{pmatrix}
A & B \\
C & D
\end{pmatrix}
\;\mathrm{and}\;
M = \begin{pmatrix}
W & X \\
Y & Z
\end{pmatrix}$$
are in $\operatorname{O}(p,q)$, then
$$(\sgn \det A)(\sgn \det W) = \sgn \det (AW+BY).$$

The analogous result for the bottom-right $q\times q$ block also holds. The subgroup $\operatorname{SO}^+(p,q)$ consists of matrices $L$ such that $\det A$ and $\det D$ are both positive.

For all matrices $L$ in $\operatorname{O}(p,q)$, the determinants of $A$ and $D$ have the property that $\frac{\det A}{\det D} = \det L$ and that $|{\det A}| = |{\det D}| \ge 1$. In particular, the subgroup $\operatorname{SO}(p,q)$ consists of matrices $L$ such that $\det A$ and $\det D$ have the same sign.

== Topology ==
Assuming both $p$ and $q$ are positive, neither of the groups $\operatorname{O}(p,q)$ nor $\operatorname{SO}(p,q)$ are connected, having $4$ and $2$ components respectively. $\pi_0(\operatorname{O}(p,q))\cong C_2\times C_2$ is the Klein four-group, with each factor being whether an element preserves or reverses the respective orientations on the $p$ and $q$ dimensional subspaces on which the form is definite; note that reversing orientation on only one of these subspaces reverses orientation on the whole space. The special orthogonal group has components $\pi_0(\operatorname{SO}(p,q))=\{(1,1),(-1,-1)\}$, each of which either preserves both orientations or reverses both orientations, in either case preserving the overall orientation.

The identity component of $\operatorname{O}(p,q)$ is often denoted $\operatorname{SO}^+(p,q)$ and can be identified with the set of elements in $\operatorname{SO}(p,q)$ that preserve both orientations. This notation is related to the notation $\operatorname{O}^+(1,3)$ for the orthochronous Lorentz group, where the $+$ refers to preserving the orientation on the first (temporal) dimension.

The group $\operatorname{O}(p,q)$ is also not compact, but contains the compact subgroups $\operatorname{O}(p)$ and $\operatorname{O}(q)$ acting on the subspaces on which the form is definite. In fact, $\operatorname{O}(p)\times\operatorname{O}(q)$ is a maximal compact subgroup of $\operatorname{O}(p,q)$, while $\operatorname{S}(\operatorname{O}(p)\times\operatorname{O}(q))$ (pairs from $\operatorname{O}(p)$ and $\operatorname{O}(q)$ having equal determinant) is a maximal compact subgroup of $\operatorname{SO}(p,q)$. Likewise, $\operatorname{SO}(p)\times\operatorname{SO}(q)$ is a maximal compact subgroup of $\operatorname{SO}^+(p,q)$. Thus, the spaces are homotopy equivalent to products of (special) orthogonal groups, from which algebro-topological invariants can be computed. (See Maximal compact subgroup.)

In particular, the fundamental group of $\operatorname{SO}^+(p,q)$ is the product of the fundamental groups of the components, $\pi_1(\operatorname{SO}^+(p,q))=\pi_1(\operatorname{SO}(p))\times\pi_1(\operatorname{SO}(q))$, and is given by:

$\pi_1(\operatorname{SO}^+(p,q))$	$p=1$	$p=2$	$p\geq 3$
$q=1$	$C_1$	$\mathbb{Z}$	$C_2$
$q=2$	$\mathbb{Z}$	$\mathbb{Z}\times\mathbb{Z}$	$\mathbb{Z}\times C_2$
$q\geq 3$	$C_2$	$C_2\times\mathbb{Z}$	$C_2\times C_2$

== Split orthogonal group ==
In even dimensions, the middle group $\operatorname{O}(n,n)$ is known as the split orthogonal group, and is of particular interest, as it occurs as the group of T-duality transformations in string theory, for example. It is the split Lie group corresponding to the complex Lie algebra $\mathfrak{so}_{2n}$ (the Lie group of the split real form of the Lie algebra); more precisely, the identity component is the split Lie group, as non-identity components cannot be reconstructed from the Lie algebra. In this sense it is opposite to the definite orthogonal group $\operatorname{O}(n):=\operatorname{O}(n,0)=\operatorname{O}(0,n)$, which is the compact real form of the complex Lie algebra.

The group $\operatorname{SO}(1,1)$ may be identified with the unit hyperbola group, a subgroup of the group of units in split-complex numbers.

In terms of being a group of Lie type – i.e., construction of an algebraic group from a Lie algebra – split orthogonal groups are Chevalley groups, while the non-split orthogonal groups require a slightly more complicated construction, and are Steinberg groups.

Split orthogonal groups are used to construct the generalized flag variety over non-algebraically closed fields.

== See also ==
- Orthogonal group
- Lorentz group
- Poincaré group
- Symmetric bilinear form

== Sources ==
- Hall, Brian C. (2015), Lie Groups, Lie Algebras, and Representations: An Elementary Introduction, Graduate Texts in Mathematics, vol. 222 (2nd ed.), Springer, ISBN 978-3319134666
- Anthony Knapp, Lie Groups Beyond an Introduction, Second Edition, Progress in Mathematics, vol. 140, Birkhäuser, Boston, 2002. ISBN 0-8176-4259-5 – see page 372 for a description of the indefinite orthogonal group
- Popov, V. L. (2001) [1994], "Orthogonal group", Encyclopedia of Mathematics, EMS Press
- Shirokov, D. S. (2012). "Lectures on Clifford algebras and spinors" Лекции по алгебрам клиффорда и спинорам (PDF). Лекционные Курсы Ноц (in Russian). 19. doi:10.4213/book1373. Zbl 1291.15063.
- Joseph A. Wolf, Spaces of constant curvature, (1967) page. 335.
