= Multicomplex number =

In mathematics, the multicomplex number systems $\Complex_n$ are defined inductively as follows: Let C_{0} be the real number system. For every n > 0 let i_{n} be a square root of −1, that is, an imaginary unit. Then $\Complex_{n+1} = \lbrace z = x + y i_{n+1} : x,y \in \Complex_n \rbrace$. In the multicomplex number systems one also requires that $i_n i_m = i_m i_n$ (commutativity). Then $\Complex_1$ is the complex number system, $\Complex_2$ is the bicomplex number system, $\Complex_3$ is the tricomplex number system of Corrado Segre, and $\Complex_n$ is the multicomplex number system of order n.

Each $\Complex_n$ forms a Banach algebra. G. Bayley Price has written about the function theory of multicomplex systems, providing details for the bicomplex system $\Complex_2 .$

The multicomplex number systems are not to be confused with Clifford numbers (elements of a Clifford algebra), since Clifford's square roots of −1 anti-commute ($i_n i_m + i_m i_n = 0$ when m ≠ n for Clifford).

Because the multicomplex numbers have several square roots of –1 that commute, they also have zero divisors: $(i_n - i_m)(i_n + i_m) = i_n^2 - i_m^2 = 0$ despite $i_n - i_m \neq 0$ and $i_n + i_m \neq 0$, and $(i_n i_m - 1)(i_n i_m + 1) = i_n^2 i_m^2 - 1 = 0$ despite $i_n i_m \neq 1$ and $i_n i_m \neq -1$. Any product $i_n i_m$ of two distinct multicomplex units behaves as the $j$ of the split-complex numbers, and therefore the multicomplex numbers contain a number of copies of the split-complex number plane.

With respect to subalgebra $\Complex_k$, k = 0, 1, ..., n − 1, the multicomplex system $\Complex_n$ is of dimension 2^{n − k} over $\Complex_k .$
