= Split-complex number =

Reals with an extra square root of +1 adjoined

In algebra, a split-complex number (or hyperbolic number, also perplex number, double number) is based on a hyperbolic unit j satisfying $j^2=1$, where $j \neq \pm 1$. A split-complex number has two real number components x and y, and is written $z=x+yj .$ The conjugate of z is $z^*=x-yj.$ Since $j^2=1,$ the product of a number z with its conjugate is $N(z) := zz^* = x^2 - y^2,$ an isotropic quadratic form.

The collection D of all split-complex numbers $z=x+yj$ for $x,y \in \R$ forms an algebra over the field of real numbers. Two split-complex numbers w and z have a product wz that satisfies $N(wz)=N(w)N(z).$ This composition of N over the algebra product makes (D, +, ×, *) a composition algebra.

A similar algebra based on $\R^2$ and component-wise operations of addition and multiplication, $(\R^2, +, \times, xy),$ where xy is the quadratic form on $\R^2,$ also forms a quadratic space. The ring isomorphism
$$\begin{align}
D &\to \mathbb{R}^2 \\
x + yj &\mapsto (x - y, x + y)
\end{align}$$
is an isometry of quadratic spaces.

Split-complex numbers have many other names; see § Synonyms below. See the article Motor variable for functions of a split-complex number.

== Definition ==
A split-complex number is an ordered pair of real numbers, written in the form

$$z = x + jy$$

where x and y are real numbers and the hyperbolic unit j, which is not a real number but an independent quantity, satisfies

$$j^2 = +1$$

In the field of complex numbers the imaginary unit i satisfies $i^2 = -1 .$ The change of sign distinguishes the split-complex numbers from the ordinary complex ones.

The collection of all such z is called the split-complex plane. Addition and multiplication of split-complex numbers are defined by

$$\begin{align}
(x + jy) + (u + jv) &= (x + u) + j(y + v) \\
(x + jy)(u + jv) &= (xu + yv) + j(xv + yu).
\end{align}$$

This multiplication is commutative, associative and distributes over addition.

=== Conjugate, modulus, and bilinear form ===
Just as for complex numbers, one can define the notion of a split-complex conjugate. If

$$z = x + jy ~,$$

then the conjugate of z is defined as

$$z^* = x - jy ~.$$

The conjugate is an involution which satisfies similar properties to the complex conjugate. Namely,

$$\begin{align}
(z + w)^* &= z^* + w^* \\
(zw)^* &= z^* w^* \\
\left(z^*\right)^* &= z.
\end{align}$$

The squared modulus of a split-complex number $z=x+jy$ is given by the isotropic quadratic form

$$\lVert z \rVert^2 = z z^* = z^* z = x^2 - y^2 ~.$$

It has the composition algebra property:

$$\lVert z w \rVert = \lVert z \rVert \lVert w \rVert ~.$$

However, this quadratic form is not positive-definite but rather has signature (1, −1), so the modulus is not a norm.

The associated bilinear form is given by

$$\langle z, w \rangle = \operatorname\mathrm{Re}\left(z^* w\right) = \operatorname\mathrm{Re} \left(z w^*\right) = xu - yv ~,$$

where $z=x+jy$ and $w=u+jv.$ Here, the real part is defined by $\operatorname\mathrm{Re}(z) = \tfrac{1}{2}(z + z^*) = x$. Another expression for the squared modulus is then

$$\lVert z \rVert^2 = \langle z, z \rangle ~.$$

Since it is not positive-definite, this bilinear form is not an inner product; nevertheless the bilinear form is frequently referred to as an indefinite inner product. A similar abuse of language refers to the modulus as a norm.

A split-complex number is invertible if and only if its modulus is nonzero ($\lVert z \rVert \ne 0$). Numbers of the form x ± j x have no inverse and are called null vectors. The multiplicative inverse of an invertible element is given by

$$z^{-1} = \frac{z^*}{ {\lVert z \rVert}^2} ~.$$

=== The diagonal basis ===
There are two nontrivial idempotent elements given by $e=\tfrac{1}{2}(1-j)$ and $e^* = \tfrac{1}{2}(1+j).$ Idempotency means that $ee=e$ and $e^*e^*=e^*.$ Both of these elements are null:

$$\lVert e \rVert = \lVert e^* \rVert = e^* e = 0 ~.$$

It is often convenient to use e and e^{∗} as an alternate basis for the split-complex plane. This basis is called the diagonal basis or null basis. The split-complex number z can be written in the null basis as

$$z = x + jy = (x - y)e + (x + y)e^* ~.$$

If we denote the number $z=ae+be^*$ for real numbers a and b by (a, b), then zero is (0, 0), one is (1, 1), split-complex addition is given by
$$\left( a_1, b_1 \right) + \left( a_2, b_2 \right) = \left( a_1 + a_2, b_1 + b_2 \right) ~,$$
and split-complex multiplication is given by
$$\left( a_1, b_1 \right) \left( a_2, b_2 \right) = \left( a_1 a_2, b_1 b_2 \right) ~.$$

The split-complex conjugate in the diagonal basis is given by
$$(a, b)^* = (b, a)$$
and the squared modulus by

$$\lVert (a, b) \rVert^2  = ab.$$

=== Isomorphism ===
This commutative diagram relates the action of the hyperbolic versor on D to squeeze mapping σ applied to $\R^2$

On the basis {e, e*} it becomes clear that the split-complex numbers are ring-isomorphic to the direct sum $\R \oplus \R$ with addition and multiplication defined pairwise.

The diagonal basis for the split-complex number plane can be invoked by using an ordered pair (x, y) for $z = x + jy$ and making the mapping

$$(u, v) = (x, y) \begin{pmatrix}1 & 1 \\1 & -1\end{pmatrix} = (x, y) S ~.$$

Now the quadratic form is $uv = (x + y)(x - y) = x^2 - y^2 ~.$ Furthermore,

$$(\cosh a, \sinh a)
\begin{pmatrix} 1 & 1 \\ 1 & -1 \end{pmatrix}
= \left(e^a, e^{-a}\right)$$

so the two parametrized hyperbolas are brought into correspondence with S.

The action of hyperbolic versor $e^{bj} \!$ then corresponds under this linear transformation to a squeeze mapping

$$\sigma: (u, v) \mapsto \left(ru, \frac{v}{r}\right),\quad r = e^b ~.$$

Though lying in the same isomorphism class in the category of rings, the split-complex plane and the direct sum of two real lines differ in their layout in the Cartesian plane. The isomorphism, as a planar mapping, consists of a counter-clockwise rotation by 45° and a dilation by √2. The dilation in particular has sometimes caused confusion in connection with areas of a hyperbolic sector. Indeed, hyperbolic angle corresponds to area of a sector in the $\R \oplus \R$ plane with its "unit circle" given by $\{(a,b) \in \R \oplus \R : ab=1\}.$ The contracted unit hyperbola $\{\cosh a+j\sinh a : a \in \R\}$ of the split-complex plane has only half the area in the span of a corresponding hyperbolic sector. Such confusion may be perpetuated when the geometry of the split-complex plane is not distinguished from that of $\R \oplus \R$.

== Geometry ==
Unit hyperbola: ‖z‖ = 1 Conjugate hyperbola: ‖z‖ = −1 Asymptotes: ‖z‖ = 0

A two-dimensional real vector space with the Minkowski inner product is called (1 + 1)-dimensional Minkowski space, often denoted $\R^{1,1}.$ Just as much of the geometry of the Euclidean plane $\R^2$ can be described with complex numbers, the geometry of the Minkowski plane $\R^{1,1}$ can be described with split-complex numbers.

The set of points

$$\left\{ z : \lVert z \rVert^2 = a^2 \right\}$$

is a hyperbola for every nonzero a in $\R.$ The hyperbola consists of a right and left branch passing through (a, 0) and (−a, 0). The case a = 1 is called the unit hyperbola. The conjugate hyperbola is given by

$$\left\{ z : \lVert z \rVert^2 = -a^2 \right\}$$

with an upper and lower branch passing through (0, a) and (0, −a). The hyperbola and conjugate hyperbola are separated by two diagonal asymptotes which form the set of null elements:

$$\left\{ z : \lVert z \rVert = 0 \right\}.$$

These two lines (sometimes called the null cone) are perpendicular in $\R^2$ and have slopes ±1.

Split-complex numbers z and w are said to be hyperbolic-orthogonal if ⟨z, w⟩ = 0. While analogous to ordinary orthogonality, particularly as it is known with ordinary complex number arithmetic, this condition is more subtle. It forms the basis for the simultaneous hyperplane concept in spacetime.

The analogue of Euler's formula for the split-complex numbers is

$$\exp(j\theta) = \cosh(\theta) + j\sinh(\theta).$$

This formula can be derived from a power series expansion using the fact that cosh has only even powers while that for sinh has odd powers. For all real values of the hyperbolic angle θ the split-complex number λ = exp(jθ) has norm 1 and lies on the right branch of the unit hyperbola. Numbers such as λ have been called hyperbolic versors.

Since λ has modulus 1, multiplying any split-complex number z by λ preserves the modulus of z and represents a hyperbolic rotation (also called a Lorentz boost or a squeeze mapping). Multiplying by λ preserves the geometric structure, taking hyperbolas to themselves and the null cone to itself.

The set of all transformations of the split-complex plane which preserve the modulus (or equivalently, the inner product) forms a group called the generalized orthogonal group O(1, 1). This group consists of the hyperbolic rotations, which form a subgroup denoted SO^{+}(1, 1), combined with four discrete reflections given by

$$z \mapsto \pm z$$
and $z \mapsto \pm z^*.$

The exponential map

$$\exp\colon (\R, +) \to \mathrm{SO}^{+}(1, 1)$$

sending θ to rotation by exp(jθ) is a group isomorphism since the usual exponential formula applies:

$$e^{j(\theta + \phi)} = e^{j\theta}e^{j\phi}.$$

If a split-complex number z does not lie on one of the diagonals, then z has a polar decomposition.

== Algebraic properties ==
As a quadratic algebra, the split-complex numbers can be described as the quotient of a polynomial ring $\R[x]$ by an ideal, in this case generated by the polynomial $x^2-1,$

$$\R[x]/(x^2-1 ).$$

The image of x in the quotient is the hyperbolic unit j. With this description, it is clear that the split-complex numbers form a commutative algebra over the real numbers. The algebra is not a field since the null elements are not invertible. All of the nonzero null elements are zero divisors.

Since addition and multiplication are continuous operations with respect to the usual topology of the plane, the split-complex numbers form a topological ring.

The algebra of split-complex numbers forms a composition algebra since

$$\lVert zw \rVert = \lVert z \rVert \lVert w \rVert ~$$

for any numbers z and w.

From the definition it is apparent that the ring of split-complex numbers is isomorphic to the group ring $\R[C_2]$ of the cyclic group C_{2} over the real numbers $\R.$

Elements of the identity component in the group of units in D have four square roots.: say $p = \exp (q), \ \ q \in D. \text{then} \pm \exp(\frac{q}{2})$ are square roots of p. Further, $\pm j \exp(\frac{q}{2})$ are also square roots of p.

The idempotents $\frac{1 \pm j}{2}$ are their own square roots, and the square root of $s \frac{1 \pm j}{2}, \ \ s > 0, \ \text{is} \ \sqrt{s} \frac{1 \pm j}{2}$

== Matrix representations ==
Using the concepts of matrices and matrix multiplication, split-complex numbers can be represented in linear algebra. The real unit 1 and hyperbolic unit j can be represented by any pair of matrices I and J satisfying I^{2} = J^{2} = I and IJ = JI = J with J ≠ ±I. Then a split-complex number a + bj can be represented by the matrix aI + bJ, and all of the ordinary rules of split-complex arithmetic can be derived from the rules of matrix arithmetic.

The most common choice is to represent 1 and j by the 2 × 2 identity matrix I and the matrix J,

$$I = \begin{pmatrix} 1 & 0 \\ 0 & 1 \end{pmatrix}, \quad
J = \begin{pmatrix} 0 & 1 \\ 1 & 0 \end{pmatrix}.$$

Then an arbitrary split-complex number a + bj can be represented by:

$$aI + bJ = \begin{pmatrix} a & b \\ b & a \end{pmatrix}.$$

More generally, any real-valued 2 × 2 matrix with a trace of zero and a determinant of negative one squares to I, so could be chosen for J. Regardless, det(aI + bJ) = a^{2} − b^{2}, the squared modulus of the split-complex number.

Larger matrices could also be used; for example, 1 could be represented by the 4 × 4 identity matrix and j could be represented by the γ^{0} Dirac matrix.

== History ==
The use of split-complex numbers dates back to 1848 when James Cockle revealed his tessarines. William Kingdon Clifford used split-complex numbers to represent sums of spins. Clifford introduced the use of split-complex numbers as coefficients in a quaternion algebra now called split-biquaternions. He called its elements "motors", a term in parallel with the "rotor" action of an ordinary complex number taken from the circle group. Extending the analogy, functions of a motor variable contrast to functions of an ordinary complex variable.

Since the late twentieth century, the split-complex multiplication has commonly been seen as a Lorentz boost of a spacetime plane. In that model, the number z = x + y j represents an event in a spatio-temporal plane, where x is measured in seconds and y in light-seconds. The future corresponds to the quadrant of events {z : |y| < x}, which has the split-complex polar decomposition $z = \rho e^{aj} \!$. The model says that z can be reached from the origin by entering a frame of reference of rapidity a and waiting ρ seconds. The split-complex equation
$$e^{aj} \ e^{bj} = e^{(a + b)j}$$
expressing products on the unit hyperbola illustrates the additivity of rapidities for collinear velocities. Simultaneity of events depends on rapidity a;
$$\{ z = \sigma j e^{aj} : \sigma \isin \R \}$$
is the line of events simultaneous with the origin in the frame of reference with rapidity a.

Two events z and w are hyperbolic-orthogonal when $z^*w+zw^* = 0$. Canonical events exp(aj) and j exp(aj) are hyperbolic orthogonal and lie on the axes of a frame of reference in which the events simultaneous with the origin are proportional to j exp(aj).

In 1933 Max Zorn was using the split-octonions and noted the composition algebra property. He realized that the Cayley–Dickson construction, used to generate division algebras, could be modified (with a factor gamma, γ) to construct other composition algebras including the split-octonions. His innovation was perpetuated by Adrian Albert, Richard D. Schafer, and others. The gamma factor, with R as base field, builds split-complex numbers as a composition algebra. Reviewing Albert for Mathematical Reviews, N. H. McCoy wrote that there was an "introduction of some new algebras of order 2^{e} over F generalizing Cayley–Dickson algebras". Taking F = R and e = 1 corresponds to the algebra of this article.

In 1935 J.C. Vignaux and A. Durañona y Vedia developed the split-complex geometric algebra and function theory in four articles in Contribución a las Ciencias Físicas y Matemáticas, National University of La Plata, República Argentina (in Spanish). These expository and pedagogical essays presented the subject for broad appreciation.

In 1941 E.F. Allen used the split-complex geometric arithmetic to establish the nine-point hyperbola of a triangle inscribed in zz^{∗} = 1.

In 1956 Mieczyslaw Warmus published "Calculus of Approximations" in Bulletin de l’Académie polonaise des sciences (see link in References). He developed two algebraic systems, each of which he called "approximate numbers", the second of which forms a real algebra. D. H. Lehmer reviewed the article in Mathematical Reviews and observed that this second system was isomorphic to the "hyperbolic complex" numbers, the subject of this article.

In 1961 Warmus continued his exposition, referring to the components of an approximate number as midpoint and radius of the interval denoted.

== Synonyms ==
Different authors have used a great variety of names for the split-complex numbers. Some of these include:

- (real) tessarines, James Cockle (1848)
- (algebraic) motors, W.K. Clifford (1882)
- hyperbolic complex numbers, J.C. Vignaux (1935), G. Cree (1949)
- bireal numbers, U. Bencivenga (1946)
- real hyperbolic numbers, N. Smith (1949)
- approximate numbers, Warmus (1956), for use in interval analysis
- double numbers, I.M. Yaglom (1968), Kantor and Solodovnikov (1989), Hazewinkel (1990), Rooney (2014)
- hyperbolic numbers, W. Miller & R. Boehning (1968), G. Sobczyk (1995)
- anormal-complex numbers, W. Benz (1973)
- perplex numbers, P. Fjelstad (1986) and Poodiack & LeClair (2009)
- countercomplex or hyperbolic, Carmody (1988)
- Lorentz numbers, F.R. Harvey (1990)
- semi-complex numbers, F. Antonuccio (1994)
- paracomplex numbers, Cruceanu, Fortuny & Gadea (1996)
- split-complex numbers, B. Rosenfeld (1997)
- spacetime numbers, N. Borota (2000)
- Study numbers, P. Lounesto (2001)
- twocomplex numbers, S. Olariu (2002)
- split binarions, K. McCrimmon (2004)

== See also ==
- Minkowski space
- Split-quaternion
- Hypercomplex number
