= Nine-point conic =

Geometric curve associated with a quadrangle

Four constituent points of the quadrangle (A, B, C, P) Six constituent lines of the quadrangle Nine-point conic (a nine-point hyperbola, since P is across side AC) If P were inside triangle △ABC, the nine-point conic would be an ellipse.

In geometry, the nine-point conic of a complete quadrangle is a conic that passes through the three diagonal points and the six midpoints of sides of the complete quadrangle.

The nine-point conic was described by Maxime Bôcher in 1892. The better-known nine-point circle is an instance of Bôcher's conic. The nine-point hyperbola is another instance.

Bôcher used the four points of the complete quadrangle as three vertices of a triangle with one independent point:

Given a triangle △ABC and a point P in its plane, a conic can be drawn through the following nine points:

the midpoints of the sides of △ABC,
the midpoints of the lines joining P to the vertices, and
the points where these last named lines cut the sides of the triangle.

The conic is an ellipse if P lies in the interior of △ABC or in one of the regions of the plane separated from the interior by two sides of the triangle, otherwise the conic is a hyperbola. Bôcher notes that when P is the orthocenter, one obtains the nine-point circle, and when P is on the circumcircle of △ABC, then the conic is an equilateral hyperbola.

In 1912 Maud Minthorn showed that the nine-point conic is the locus of the center of a conic through four given points.

The nine-point conic with respect to a line l is the conic through the six harmonic conjugates of the intersection of the sides of the complete quadrangle with l.
