= Trigintaduonion =

Hypercomplex number system

Trigintaduonions
- Symbol: $\mathbb T$
- Type: Hypercomplex algebra
- Units: e_{0}, ..., e_{31}
- Multiplicative identity: e_{0}
- Main properties: Flexibility; Power associativity; Distributivity

In abstract algebra, the trigintaduonions, also known as the 32-ions, 32-nions, 2^{5}-nions form a 32-dimensional noncommutative and nonassociative algebra over the real numbers.

== Names ==
The word trigintaduonion is derived from Latin triginta 'thirty' + duo 'two' + the suffix -nion, which is used for hypercomplex number systems. Other names include 32-ion, 32-nion, 2^{5}-ion, and 2^{5}-nion. Trigintaduonions have also been referred to as pathions ($\mathbb P$), which Robert P. C. de Marrais had named in reference to the 32 paths of wisdom from the Kabbalistic (Jewish mystical) text Sefer Yetzirah. However, this term is not generally accepted as standard terminology.

== Definition ==
Every trigintaduonion is a linear combination of the unit trigintaduonions $e_0$, $e_1$, $e_2$, $e_3$, ..., $e_{31}$, which form a basis of the vector space of trigintaduonions. Every trigintaduonion can be represented in the form

$$x = x_0 e_0 + x_1 e_1 + x_2 e_2 + \cdots + x_{30} e_{30} + x_{31} e_{31}$$

with real coefficients x_{i}.

The trigintaduonions can be obtained by applying the Cayley–Dickson construction to the sedenions. Applying the Cayley–Dickson construction to the trigintaduonions yields a 64-dimensional algebra called the 64-ions, 64-nions, sexagintaquatronions, or sexagintaquattuornions.

As a result, the trigintaduonions can also be defined as the following.

An algebra of dimension 4 over the octonions $\mathbb{O}$:

$\sum_{i=0}^{3} a_i \cdot e_i$ where $a_i \in \mathbb{O}$ and $e_i \notin \mathbb{O}$

An algebra of dimension 8 over quaternions $\mathbb{H}$:

$\sum_{i=0}^{7} a_i \cdot e_i$ where $a_i \in \mathbb{H}$ and $e_i \notin \mathbb{H}$

An algebra of dimension 16 over the complex numbers $\mathbb{C}$:

$\sum_{i=0}^{15} a_i \cdot e_i$ where $a_i \in \mathbb{C}$ and $e_i \notin \mathbb{C}$

An algebra of dimension 32 over the real numbers $\mathbb{R}$:

$\sum_{i=0}^{31} a_i \cdot e_i$ where $a_i \in \mathbb{R}$ and $e_i \notin \mathbb{R}$

$\mathbb{R}, \mathbb{C}, \mathbb{H}, \mathbb{O}, \mathbb{S}$ are all subsets of $\mathbb{T}$. This relation can be expressed as:

$$\mathbb{R} \subset \mathbb{C} \subset \mathbb{H} \subset \mathbb{O} \subset \mathbb{S} \subset \mathbb{T} \subset \cdots$$

== Multiplication ==
=== Properties ===
Like octonions and sedenions, multiplication of trigintaduonions is neither commutative nor associative. However, being products of a Cayley–Dickson construction, trigintaduonions have the property of power associativity, which can be stated as that, for any element $x$ of $\mathbb{T}$, the power $x^n$ is well defined. They are also flexible, and multiplication is distributive over addition. As with the sedenions, the trigintaduonions contain zero divisors and are thus not a division algebra. Whereas the sedenions have 84 zero divisors, the trigintaduonions have 1,260 zero divisors derived from 147 distinct triples. Furthermore, in contrast to the octonions, both algebras do not even have the property of being alternative.

=== Geometric representations ===
Whereas octonion unit multiplication patterns can be geometrically represented by PG(2,2) (also known as the Fano plane) and sedenion unit multiplication by PG(3,2), trigintaduonion unit multiplication can be geometrically represented by PG(4,2).

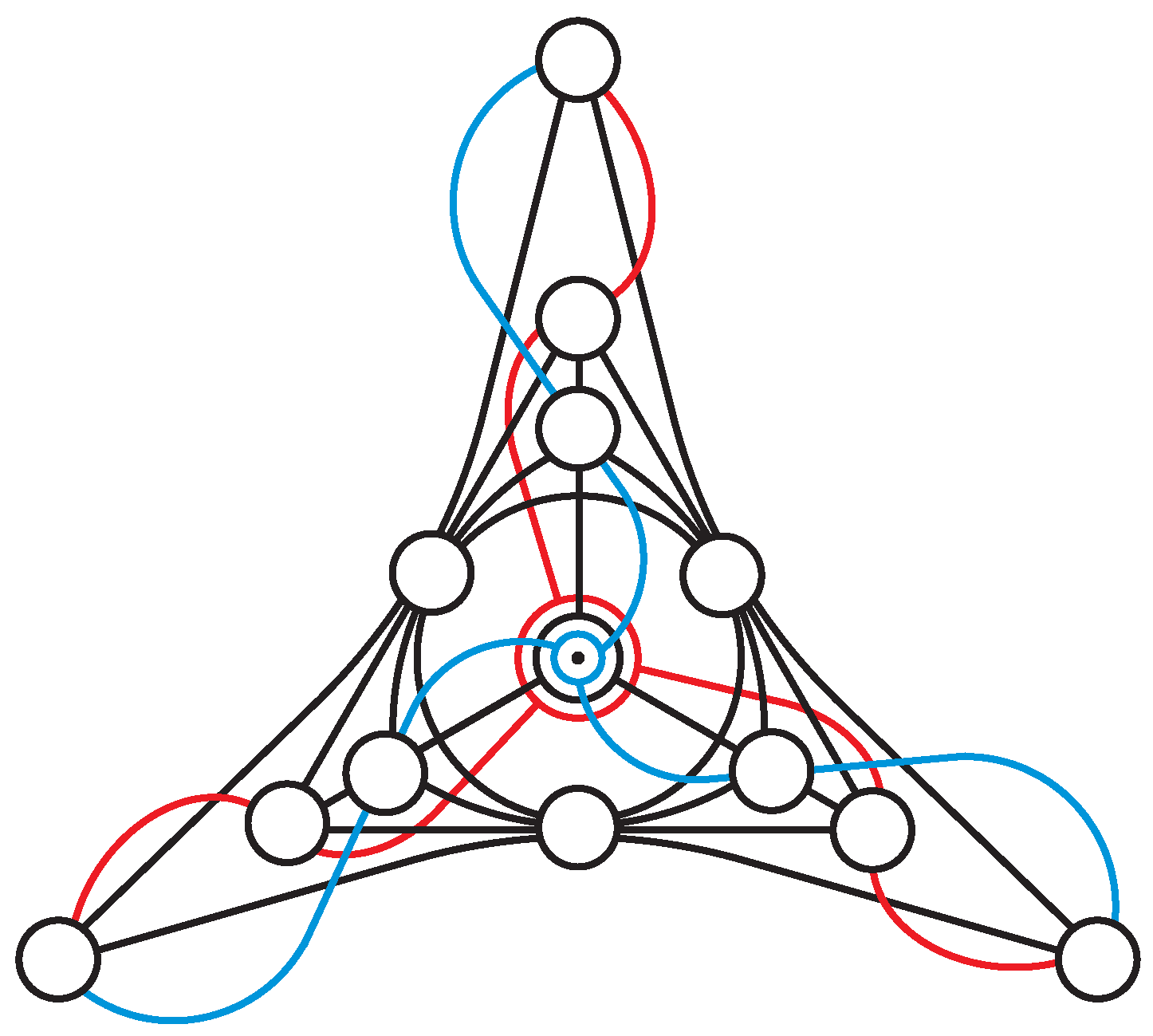
An illustration of the structure of the (15_{4} 20_{3}) or Cayley–Salmon configuration

=== Multiplication tables ===
The multiplication of the unit trigintaduonions is illustrated in the two tables below. Combined, they form a single 32×32 table with 1024 cells.

Below is the trigintaduonion multiplication table for $e_j, 0 \leq j \leq 15$. The top half of this table, for $e_i, 0 \leq i \leq 15$, corresponds to the multiplication table for the sedenions. The top left quadrant of the table, for $e_i, 0 \leq i \leq 7$ and $e_j, 0 \leq j \leq 7$, corresponds to the multiplication table for the octonions.

$e_ie_j$		$e_j$															
$e_ie_j$		$e_0$	$e_1$	$e_2$	$e_3$	$e_4$	$e_5$	$e_6$	$e_7$	$e_8$	$e_9$	$e_{10}$	$e_{11}$	$e_{12}$	$e_{13}$	$e_{14}$	$e_{15}$
$e_i$	$e_0$	$e_0$	$e_1$	$e_2$	$e_3$	$e_4$	$e_5$	$e_6$	$e_7$	$e_8$	$e_9$	$e_{10}$	$e_{11}$	$e_{12}$	$e_{13}$	$e_{14}$	$e_{15}$
$e_i$	$e_{1}$	$e_{1}$	$-e_{0}$	$e_{3}$	$-e_{2}$	$e_{5}$	$-e_{4}$	$-e_{7}$	$e_{6}$	$e_{9}$	$-e_{8}$	$-e_{11}$	$e_{10}$	$-e_{13}$	$e_{12}$	$e_{15}$	$-e_{14}$
$e_i$	$e_{2}$	$e_{2}$	$-e_{3}$	$-e_{0}$	$e_{1}$	$e_{6}$	$e_{7}$	$-e_{4}$	$-e_{5}$	$e_{10}$	$e_{11}$	$-e_{8}$	$-e_{9}$	$-e_{14}$	$-e_{15}$	$e_{12}$	$e_{13}$
$e_i$	$e_{3}$	$e_{3}$	$e_{2}$	$-e_{1}$	$-e_{0}$	$e_{7}$	$-e_{6}$	$e_{5}$	$-e_{4}$	$e_{11}$	$-e_{10}$	$e_{9}$	$-e_{8}$	$-e_{15}$	$e_{14}$	$-e_{13}$	$e_{12}$
$e_i$	$e_{4}$	$e_{4}$	$-e_{5}$	$-e_{6}$	$-e_{7}$	$-e_{0}$	$e_{1}$	$e_{2}$	$e_{3}$	$e_{12}$	$e_{13}$	$e_{14}$	$e_{15}$	$-e_{8}$	$-e_{9}$	$-e_{10}$	$-e_{11}$
$e_i$	$e_{5}$	$e_{5}$	$e_{4}$	$-e_{7}$	$e_{6}$	$-e_{1}$	$-e_{0}$	$-e_{3}$	$e_{2}$	$e_{13}$	$-e_{12}$	$e_{15}$	$-e_{14}$	$e_{9}$	$-e_{8}$	$e_{11}$	$-e_{10}$
$e_i$	$e_{6}$	$e_{6}$	$e_{7}$	$e_{4}$	$-e_{5}$	$-e_{2}$	$e_{3}$	$-e_{0}$	$-e_{1}$	$e_{14}$	$-e_{15}$	$-e_{12}$	$e_{13}$	$e_{10}$	$-e_{11}$	$-e_{8}$	$e_{9}$
$e_i$	$e_{7}$	$e_{7}$	$-e_{6}$	$e_{5}$	$e_{4}$	$-e_{3}$	$-e_{2}$	$e_{1}$	$-e_{0}$	$e_{15}$	$e_{14}$	$-e_{13}$	$-e_{12}$	$e_{11}$	$e_{10}$	$-e_{9}$	$-e_{8}$
$e_i$	$e_{8}$	$e_{8}$	$-e_{9}$	$-e_{10}$	$-e_{11}$	$-e_{12}$	$-e_{13}$	$-e_{14}$	$-e_{15}$	$-e_{0}$	$e_{1}$	$e_{2}$	$e_{3}$	$e_{4}$	$e_{5}$	$e_{6}$	$e_{7}$
$e_i$	$e_{9}$	$e_{9}$	$e_{8}$	$-e_{11}$	$e_{10}$	$-e_{13}$	$e_{12}$	$e_{15}$	$-e_{14}$	$-e_{1}$	$-e_{0}$	$-e_{3}$	$e_{2}$	$-e_{5}$	$e_{4}$	$e_{7}$	$-e_{6}$
$e_i$	$e_{10}$	$e_{10}$	$e_{11}$	$e_{8}$	$-e_{9}$	$-e_{14}$	$-e_{15}$	$e_{12}$	$e_{13}$	$-e_{2}$	$e_{3}$	$-e_{0}$	$-e_{1}$	$-e_{6}$	$-e_{7}$	$e_{4}$	$e_{5}$
$e_i$	$e_{11}$	$e_{11}$	$-e_{10}$	$e_{9}$	$e_{8}$	$-e_{15}$	$e_{14}$	$-e_{13}$	$e_{12}$	$-e_{3}$	$-e_{2}$	$e_{1}$	$-e_{0}$	$-e_{7}$	$e_{6}$	$-e_{5}$	$e_{4}$
$e_i$	$e_{12}$	$e_{12}$	$e_{13}$	$e_{14}$	$e_{15}$	$e_{8}$	$-e_{9}$	$-e_{10}$	$-e_{11}$	$-e_{4}$	$e_{5}$	$e_{6}$	$e_{7}$	$-e_{0}$	$-e_{1}$	$-e_{2}$	$-e_{3}$
$e_i$	$e_{13}$	$e_{13}$	$-e_{12}$	$e_{15}$	$-e_{14}$	$e_{9}$	$e_{8}$	$e_{11}$	$-e_{10}$	$-e_{5}$	$-e_{4}$	$e_{7}$	$-e_{6}$	$e_{1}$	$-e_{0}$	$e_{3}$	$-e_{2}$
$e_i$	$e_{14}$	$e_{14}$	$-e_{15}$	$-e_{12}$	$e_{13}$	$e_{10}$	$-e_{11}$	$e_{8}$	$e_{9}$	$-e_{6}$	$-e_{7}$	$-e_{4}$	$e_{5}$	$e_{2}$	$-e_{3}$	$-e_{0}$	$e_{1}$
$e_i$	$e_{15}$	$e_{15}$	$e_{14}$	$-e_{13}$	$-e_{12}$	$e_{11}$	$e_{10}$	$-e_{9}$	$e_{8}$	$-e_{7}$	$e_{6}$	$-e_{5}$	$-e_{4}$	$e_{3}$	$e_{2}$	$-e_{1}$	$-e_{0}$
$e_i$	$e_{16}$	$e_{16}$	$-e_{17}$	$-e_{18}$	$-e_{19}$	$-e_{20}$	$-e_{21}$	$-e_{22}$	$-e_{23}$	$-e_{24}$	$-e_{25}$	$-e_{26}$	$-e_{27}$	$-e_{28}$	$-e_{29}$	$-e_{30}$	$-e_{31}$
$e_i$	$e_{17}$	$e_{17}$	$e_{16}$	$-e_{19}$	$e_{18}$	$-e_{21}$	$e_{20}$	$e_{23}$	$-e_{22}$	$-e_{25}$	$e_{24}$	$e_{27}$	$-e_{26}$	$e_{29}$	$-e_{28}$	$-e_{31}$	$e_{30}$
$e_i$	$e_{18}$	$e_{18}$	$e_{19}$	$e_{16}$	$-e_{17}$	$-e_{22}$	$-e_{23}$	$e_{20}$	$e_{21}$	$-e_{26}$	$-e_{27}$	$e_{24}$	$e_{25}$	$e_{30}$	$e_{31}$	$-e_{28}$	$-e_{29}$
$e_i$	$e_{19}$	$e_{19}$	$-e_{18}$	$e_{17}$	$e_{16}$	$-e_{23}$	$e_{22}$	$-e_{21}$	$e_{20}$	$-e_{27}$	$e_{26}$	$-e_{25}$	$e_{24}$	$e_{31}$	$-e_{30}$	$e_{29}$	$-e_{28}$
$e_i$	$e_{20}$	$e_{20}$	$e_{21}$	$e_{22}$	$e_{23}$	$e_{16}$	$-e_{17}$	$-e_{18}$	$-e_{19}$	$-e_{28}$	$-e_{29}$	$-e_{30}$	$-e_{31}$	$e_{24}$	$e_{25}$	$e_{26}$	$e_{27}$
$e_i$	$e_{21}$	$e_{21}$	$-e_{20}$	$e_{23}$	$-e_{22}$	$e_{17}$	$e_{16}$	$e_{19}$	$-e_{18}$	$-e_{29}$	$e_{28}$	$-e_{31}$	$e_{30}$	$-e_{25}$	$e_{24}$	$-e_{27}$	$e_{26}$
$e_i$	$e_{22}$	$e_{22}$	$-e_{23}$	$-e_{20}$	$e_{21}$	$e_{18}$	$-e_{19}$	$e_{16}$	$e_{17}$	$-e_{30}$	$e_{31}$	$e_{28}$	$-e_{29}$	$-e_{26}$	$e_{27}$	$e_{24}$	$-e_{25}$
$e_i$	$e_{23}$	$e_{23}$	$e_{22}$	$-e_{21}$	$-e_{20}$	$e_{19}$	$e_{18}$	$-e_{17}$	$e_{16}$	$-e_{31}$	$-e_{30}$	$e_{29}$	$e_{28}$	$-e_{27}$	$-e_{26}$	$e_{25}$	$e_{24}$
$e_i$	$e_{24}$	$e_{24}$	$e_{25}$	$e_{26}$	$e_{27}$	$e_{28}$	$e_{29}$	$e_{30}$	$e_{31}$	$e_{16}$	$-e_{17}$	$-e_{18}$	$-e_{19}$	$-e_{20}$	$-e_{21}$	$-e_{22}$	$-e_{23}$
$e_i$	$e_{25}$	$e_{25}$	$-e_{24}$	$e_{27}$	$-e_{26}$	$e_{29}$	$-e_{28}$	$-e_{31}$	$e_{30}$	$e_{17}$	$e_{16}$	$e_{19}$	$-e_{18}$	$e_{21}$	$-e_{20}$	$-e_{23}$	$e_{22}$
$e_i$	$e_{26}$	$e_{26}$	$-e_{27}$	$-e_{24}$	$e_{25}$	$e_{30}$	$e_{31}$	$-e_{28}$	$-e_{29}$	$e_{18}$	$-e_{19}$	$e_{16}$	$e_{17}$	$e_{22}$	$e_{23}$	$-e_{20}$	$-e_{21}$
$e_i$	$e_{27}$	$e_{27}$	$e_{26}$	$-e_{25}$	$-e_{24}$	$e_{31}$	$-e_{30}$	$e_{29}$	$-e_{28}$	$e_{19}$	$e_{18}$	$-e_{17}$	$e_{16}$	$e_{23}$	$-e_{22}$	$e_{21}$	$-e_{20}$
$e_i$	$e_{28}$	$e_{28}$	$-e_{29}$	$-e_{30}$	$-e_{31}$	$-e_{24}$	$e_{25}$	$e_{26}$	$e_{27}$	$e_{20}$	$-e_{21}$	$-e_{22}$	$-e_{23}$	$e_{16}$	$e_{17}$	$e_{18}$	$e_{19}$
$e_i$	$e_{29}$	$e_{29}$	$e_{28}$	$-e_{31}$	$e_{30}$	$-e_{25}$	$-e_{24}$	$-e_{27}$	$e_{26}$	$e_{21}$	$e_{20}$	$-e_{23}$	$e_{22}$	$-e_{17}$	$e_{16}$	$-e_{19}$	$e_{18}$
$e_i$	$e_{30}$	$e_{30}$	$e_{31}$	$e_{28}$	$-e_{29}$	$-e_{26}$	$e_{27}$	$-e_{24}$	$-e_{25}$	$e_{22}$	$e_{23}$	$e_{20}$	$-e_{21}$	$-e_{18}$	$e_{19}$	$e_{16}$	$-e_{17}$
$e_i$	$e_{31}$	$e_{31}$	$-e_{30}$	$e_{29}$	$e_{28}$	$-e_{27}$	$-e_{26}$	$e_{25}$	$-e_{24}$	$e_{23}$	$-e_{22}$	$e_{21}$	$e_{20}$	$-e_{19}$	$-e_{18}$	$e_{17}$	$e_{16}$

Below is the trigintaduonion multiplication table for $e_j, 16 \leq j \leq 31$.

$e_ie_j$		$e_j$															
$e_ie_j$		$e_{16}$	$e_{17}$	$e_{18}$	$e_{19}$	$e_{20}$	$e_{21}$	$e_{22}$	$e_{23}$	$e_{24}$	$e_{25}$	$e_{26}$	$e_{27}$	$e_{28}$	$e_{29}$	$e_{30}$	$e_{31}$
$e_i$	$e_0$	$e_{16}$	$e_{17}$	$e_{18}$	$e_{19}$	$e_{20}$	$e_{21}$	$e_{22}$	$e_{23}$	$e_{24}$	$e_{25}$	$e_{26}$	$e_{27}$	$e_{28}$	$e_{29}$	$e_{30}$	$e_{31}$
$e_i$	$e_{1}$	$e_{17}$	$-e_{16}$	$-e_{19}$	$e_{18}$	$-e_{21}$	$e_{20}$	$e_{23}$	$-e_{22}$	$-e_{25}$	$e_{24}$	$e_{27}$	$-e_{26}$	$e_{29}$	$-e_{28}$	$-e_{31}$	$e_{30}$
$e_i$	$e_{2}$	$e_{18}$	$e_{19}$	$-e_{16}$	$-e_{17}$	$-e_{22}$	$-e_{23}$	$e_{20}$	$e_{21}$	$-e_{26}$	$-e_{27}$	$e_{24}$	$e_{25}$	$e_{30}$	$e_{31}$	$-e_{28}$	$-e_{29}$
$e_i$	$e_{3}$	$e_{19}$	$-e_{18}$	$e_{17}$	$-e_{16}$	$-e_{23}$	$e_{22}$	$-e_{21}$	$e_{20}$	$-e_{27}$	$e_{26}$	$-e_{25}$	$e_{24}$	$e_{31}$	$-e_{30}$	$e_{29}$	$-e_{28}$
$e_i$	$e_{4}$	$e_{20}$	$e_{21}$	$e_{22}$	$e_{23}$	$-e_{16}$	$-e_{17}$	$-e_{18}$	$-e_{19}$	$-e_{28}$	$-e_{29}$	$-e_{30}$	$-e_{31}$	$e_{24}$	$e_{25}$	$e_{26}$	$e_{27}$
$e_i$	$e_{5}$	$e_{21}$	$-e_{20}$	$e_{23}$	$-e_{22}$	$e_{17}$	$-e_{16}$	$e_{19}$	$-e_{18}$	$-e_{29}$	$e_{28}$	$-e_{31}$	$e_{30}$	$-e_{25}$	$e_{24}$	$-e_{27}$	$e_{26}$
$e_i$	$e_{6}$	$e_{22}$	$-e_{23}$	$-e_{20}$	$e_{21}$	$e_{18}$	$-e_{19}$	$-e_{16}$	$e_{17}$	$-e_{30}$	$e_{31}$	$e_{28}$	$-e_{29}$	$-e_{26}$	$e_{27}$	$e_{24}$	$-e_{25}$
$e_i$	$e_{7}$	$e_{23}$	$e_{22}$	$-e_{21}$	$-e_{20}$	$e_{19}$	$e_{18}$	$-e_{17}$	$-e_{16}$	$-e_{31}$	$-e_{30}$	$e_{29}$	$e_{28}$	$-e_{27}$	$-e_{26}$	$e_{25}$	$e_{24}$
$e_i$	$e_{8}$	$e_{24}$	$e_{25}$	$e_{26}$	$e_{27}$	$e_{28}$	$e_{29}$	$e_{30}$	$e_{31}$	$-e_{16}$	$-e_{17}$	$-e_{18}$	$-e_{19}$	$-e_{20}$	$-e_{21}$	$-e_{22}$	$-e_{23}$
$e_i$	$e_{9}$	$e_{25}$	$-e_{24}$	$e_{27}$	$-e_{26}$	$e_{29}$	$-e_{28}$	$-e_{31}$	$e_{30}$	$e_{17}$	$-e_{16}$	$e_{19}$	$-e_{18}$	$e_{21}$	$-e_{20}$	$-e_{23}$	$e_{22}$
$e_i$	$e_{10}$	$e_{26}$	$-e_{27}$	$-e_{24}$	$e_{25}$	$e_{30}$	$e_{31}$	$-e_{28}$	$-e_{29}$	$e_{18}$	$-e_{19}$	$-e_{16}$	$e_{17}$	$e_{22}$	$e_{23}$	$-e_{20}$	$-e_{21}$
$e_i$	$e_{11}$	$e_{27}$	$e_{26}$	$-e_{25}$	$-e_{24}$	$e_{31}$	$-e_{30}$	$e_{29}$	$-e_{28}$	$e_{19}$	$e_{18}$	$-e_{17}$	$-e_{16}$	$e_{23}$	$-e_{22}$	$e_{21}$	$-e_{20}$
$e_i$	$e_{12}$	$e_{28}$	$-e_{29}$	$-e_{30}$	$-e_{31}$	$-e_{24}$	$e_{25}$	$e_{26}$	$e_{27}$	$e_{20}$	$-e_{21}$	$-e_{22}$	$-e_{23}$	$-e_{16}$	$e_{17}$	$e_{18}$	$e_{19}$
$e_i$	$e_{13}$	$e_{29}$	$e_{28}$	$-e_{31}$	$e_{30}$	$-e_{25}$	$-e_{24}$	$-e_{27}$	$e_{26}$	$e_{21}$	$e_{20}$	$-e_{23}$	$e_{22}$	$-e_{17}$	$-e_{16}$	$-e_{19}$	$e_{18}$
$e_i$	$e_{14}$	$e_{30}$	$e_{31}$	$e_{28}$	$-e_{29}$	$-e_{26}$	$e_{27}$	$-e_{24}$	$-e_{25}$	$e_{22}$	$e_{23}$	$e_{20}$	$-e_{21}$	$-e_{18}$	$e_{19}$	$-e_{16}$	$-e_{17}$
$e_i$	$e_{15}$	$e_{31}$	$-e_{30}$	$e_{29}$	$e_{28}$	$-e_{27}$	$-e_{26}$	$e_{25}$	$-e_{24}$	$e_{23}$	$-e_{22}$	$e_{21}$	$e_{20}$	$-e_{19}$	$-e_{18}$	$e_{17}$	$-e_{16}$
$e_i$	$e_{16}$	$-e_{0}$	$e_{1}$	$e_{2}$	$e_{3}$	$e_{4}$	$e_{5}$	$e_{6}$	$e_{7}$	$e_{8}$	$e_{9}$	$e_{10}$	$e_{11}$	$e_{12}$	$e_{13}$	$e_{14}$	$e_{15}$
$e_i$	$e_{17}$	$-e_{1}$	$-e_{0}$	$-e_{3}$	$e_{2}$	$-e_{5}$	$e_{4}$	$e_{7}$	$-e_{6}$	$-e_{9}$	$e_{8}$	$e_{11}$	$-e_{10}$	$e_{13}$	$-e_{12}$	$-e_{15}$	$e_{14}$
$e_i$	$e_{18}$	$-e_{2}$	$e_{3}$	$-e_{0}$	$-e_{1}$	$-e_{6}$	$-e_{7}$	$e_{4}$	$e_{5}$	$-e_{10}$	$-e_{11}$	$e_{8}$	$e_{9}$	$e_{14}$	$e_{15}$	$-e_{12}$	$-e_{13}$
$e_i$	$e_{19}$	$-e_{3}$	$-e_{2}$	$e_{1}$	$-e_{0}$	$-e_{7}$	$e_{6}$	$-e_{5}$	$e_{4}$	$-e_{11}$	$e_{10}$	$-e_{9}$	$e_{8}$	$e_{15}$	$-e_{14}$	$e_{13}$	$-e_{12}$
$e_i$	$e_{20}$	$-e_{4}$	$e_{5}$	$e_{6}$	$e_{7}$	$-e_{0}$	$-e_{1}$	$-e_{2}$	$-e_{3}$	$-e_{12}$	$-e_{13}$	$-e_{14}$	$-e_{15}$	$e_{8}$	$e_{9}$	$e_{10}$	$e_{11}$
$e_i$	$e_{21}$	$-e_{5}$	$-e_{4}$	$e_{7}$	$-e_{6}$	$e_{1}$	$-e_{0}$	$e_{3}$	$-e_{2}$	$-e_{13}$	$e_{12}$	$-e_{15}$	$e_{14}$	$-e_{9}$	$e_{8}$	$-e_{11}$	$e_{10}$
$e_i$	$e_{22}$	$-e_{6}$	$-e_{7}$	$-e_{4}$	$e_{5}$	$e_{2}$	$-e_{3}$	$-e_{0}$	$e_{1}$	$-e_{14}$	$e_{15}$	$e_{12}$	$-e_{13}$	$-e_{10}$	$e_{11}$	$e_{8}$	$-e_{9}$
$e_i$	$e_{23}$	$-e_{7}$	$e_{6}$	$-e_{5}$	$-e_{4}$	$e_{3}$	$e_{2}$	$-e_{1}$	$-e_{0}$	$-e_{15}$	$-e_{14}$	$e_{13}$	$e_{12}$	$-e_{11}$	$-e_{10}$	$e_{9}$	$e_{8}$
$e_i$	$e_{24}$	$-e_{8}$	$e_{9}$	$e_{10}$	$e_{11}$	$e_{12}$	$e_{13}$	$e_{14}$	$e_{15}$	$-e_{0}$	$-e_{1}$	$-e_{2}$	$-e_{3}$	$-e_{4}$	$-e_{5}$	$-e_{6}$	$-e_{7}$
$e_i$	$e_{25}$	$-e_{9}$	$-e_{8}$	$e_{11}$	$-e_{10}$	$e_{13}$	$-e_{12}$	$-e_{15}$	$e_{14}$	$e_{1}$	$-e_{0}$	$e_{3}$	$-e_{2}$	$e_{5}$	$-e_{4}$	$-e_{7}$	$e_{6}$
$e_i$	$e_{26}$	$-e_{10}$	$-e_{11}$	$-e_{8}$	$e_{9}$	$e_{14}$	$e_{15}$	$-e_{12}$	$-e_{13}$	$e_{2}$	$-e_{3}$	$-e_{0}$	$e_{1}$	$e_{6}$	$e_{7}$	$-e_{4}$	$-e_{5}$
$e_i$	$e_{27}$	$-e_{11}$	$e_{10}$	$-e_{9}$	$-e_{8}$	$e_{15}$	$-e_{14}$	$e_{13}$	$-e_{12}$	$e_{3}$	$e_{2}$	$-e_{1}$	$-e_{0}$	$e_{7}$	$-e_{6}$	$e_{5}$	$-e_{4}$
$e_i$	$e_{28}$	$-e_{12}$	$-e_{13}$	$-e_{14}$	$-e_{15}$	$-e_{8}$	$e_{9}$	$e_{10}$	$e_{11}$	$e_{4}$	$-e_{5}$	$-e_{6}$	$-e_{7}$	$-e_{0}$	$e_{1}$	$e_{2}$	$e_{3}$
$e_i$	$e_{29}$	$-e_{13}$	$e_{12}$	$-e_{15}$	$e_{14}$	$-e_{9}$	$-e_{8}$	$-e_{11}$	$e_{10}$	$e_{5}$	$e_{4}$	$-e_{7}$	$e_{6}$	$-e_{1}$	$-e_{0}$	$-e_{3}$	$e_{2}$
$e_i$	$e_{30}$	$-e_{14}$	$e_{15}$	$e_{12}$	$-e_{13}$	$-e_{10}$	$e_{11}$	$-e_{8}$	$-e_{9}$	$e_{6}$	$e_{7}$	$e_{4}$	$-e_{5}$	$-e_{2}$	$e_{3}$	$-e_{0}$	$-e_{1}$
$e_i$	$e_{31}$	$-e_{15}$	$-e_{14}$	$e_{13}$	$e_{12}$	$-e_{11}$	$-e_{10}$	$e_{9}$	$-e_{8}$	$e_{7}$	$-e_{6}$	$e_{5}$	$e_{4}$	$-e_{3}$	$-e_{2}$	$e_{1}$	$-e_{0}$

=== Triples ===
There are 155 distinguished triples (or triads) of imaginary trigintaduonion units in the trigintaduonion multiplication table, which are listed below. In comparison, the octonions have 7 such triples, the sedenions have 35, while the sexagintaquatronions have 651.

- 45 triples of type {α, α, β}: {3, 13, 14}, {3, 21, 22}, {3, 25, 26}, {5, 11, 14}, {5, 19, 22}, {5, 25, 28}, {6, 11, 13}, {6, 19, 21}, {6, 26, 28}, {7, 9, 14}, {7, 10, 13}, {7, 11, 12}, {7, 17, 22}, {7, 18, 21}, {7, 19, 20}, {7, 25, 30}, {7, 26, 29}, {7, 27, 28}, {9, 19, 26}, {9, 21, 28}, {10, 19, 25}, {10, 22, 28}, {11, 17, 26}, {11, 18, 25}, {11, 19, 24}, {11, 21, 30}, {11, 22, 29}, {11, 23, 28}, {12, 21, 25}, {12, 22, 26}, {13, 17, 28}, {13, 19, 30}, {13, 20, 25}, {13, 21, 24}, {13, 22, 27}, {13, 23, 26}, {14, 18, 28}, {14, 19, 29}, {14, 20, 26}, {14, 21, 27}, {14, 22, 24}, {14, 23, 25}, {15, 19, 28}, {15, 21, 26}, {15, 22, 25}
- 20 triples of type {β, β, β}: {3, 5, 6}, {3, 9, 10}, {3, 17, 18}, {3, 29, 30}, {5, 9, 12}, {5, 17, 20}, {5, 27, 30}, {6, 10, 12}, {6, 18, 20}, {6, 27, 29}, {9, 17, 24}, {9, 23, 30}, {10, 18, 24}, {10, 23, 29}, {12, 20, 24}, {12, 23, 27}, {15, 17, 30}, {15, 18, 29}, {15, 20, 27}, {15, 23, 24}
- 15 triples of type {β, β, β}: {3, 12, 15}, {3, 20, 23}, {3, 24, 27}, {5, 10, 15}, {5, 18, 23}, {5, 24, 29}, {6, 9, 15}, {6, 17, 23}, {6, 24, 30}, {9, 18, 27}, {9, 20, 29}, {10, 17, 27}, {10, 20, 30}, {12, 17, 29}, {12, 18, 30}
- 60 triples of type {α, β, γ}: {1, 6, 7}, {1, 10, 11}, {1, 12, 13}, {1, 14, 15}, {1, 18, 19}, {1, 20, 21}, {1, 22, 23}, {1, 24, 25}, {1, 26, 27}, {1, 28, 29}, {2, 5, 7}, {2, 9, 11}, {2, 12, 14}, {2, 13, 15}, {2, 17, 19}, {2, 20, 22}, {2, 21, 23}, {2, 24, 26}, {2, 25, 27}, {2, 28, 30}, {3, 4, 7}, {3, 8, 11}, {3, 16, 19}, {3, 28, 31}, {4, 9, 13}, {4, 10, 14}, {4, 11, 15}, {4, 17, 21}, {4, 18, 22}, {4, 19, 23}, {4, 24, 28}, {4, 25, 29}, {4, 26, 30}, {5, 8, 13}, {5, 16, 21}, {5, 26, 31}, {6, 8, 14}, {6, 16, 22}, {6, 25, 31}, {7, 8, 15}, {7, 16, 23}, {7, 24, 31}, {8, 17, 25}, {8, 18, 26}, {8, 19, 27}, {8, 20, 28}, {8, 21, 29}, {8, 22, 30}, {9, 16, 25}, {9, 22, 31}, {10, 16, 26}, {10, 21, 31}, {11, 16, 27}, {11, 20, 31}, {12, 16, 28}, {12, 19, 31}, {13, 16, 29}, {13, 18, 31}, {14, 16, 30}, {14, 17, 31}
- 15 triples of type {β, γ, γ}: {1, 2, 3}, {1, 4, 5}, {1, 8, 9}, {1, 16, 17}, {1, 30, 31}, {2, 4, 6}, {2, 8, 10}, {2, 16, 18}, {2, 29, 31}, {4, 8, 12}, {4, 16, 20}, {4, 27, 31}, {8, 16, 24}, {8, 23, 31}, {15, 16, 31}

== Applications ==
The trigintaduonions have applications in quantum physics and other branches of modern physics. More recently, the trigintaduonions and other hypercomplex numbers have also been used in research on neural networks and digital signal processing.
