= Split-biquaternion =

Element of an algebra using quaternions and split-complex numbers

In mathematics, a split-biquaternion is a hypercomplex number of the form

$$q = w + x\mathrm{i} + y\mathrm{j} + z\mathrm{k} ,$$

where w, x, y, and z are split-complex numbers and i, j, and k multiply as in the quaternion group. Since each coefficient w, x, y, z spans two real dimensions, the split-biquaternion is an element of an eight-dimensional vector space. Considering that it carries a multiplication, this vector space is an algebra over the real field, or an algebra over a ring where the split-complex numbers form the ring. This algebra was introduced by William Kingdon Clifford in an 1873 article for the London Mathematical Society. It has been repeatedly noted in mathematical literature since then, variously as a deviation in terminology, an illustration of the tensor product of algebras, and as an illustration of the direct sum of algebras. The split-biquaternions have been identified in various ways by algebraists; see § Synonyms below.

== Modern definition ==
A split-biquaternion is ring isomorphic to the Clifford algebra Cl_{0,3}(R). This is the geometric algebra generated by three orthogonal imaginary unit basis directions, {e_{1}, e_{2}, e_{3}} under the combination rule

$$e_i e_j =  \begin{cases}
-1  & i=j,  \\
- e_j e_i &   i \neq j
\end{cases}$$

giving an algebra spanned by the 8 basis elements {1, e_{1}, e_{2}, e_{3}, e_{1}e_{2}, e_{2}e_{3}, e_{3}e_{1}, e_{1}e_{2}e_{3}}, with (e_{1}e_{2})^{2} = (e_{2}e_{3})^{2} = (e_{3}e_{1})^{2} = −1 and ω^{2} = (e_{1}e_{2}e_{3})^{2} = +1. The sub-algebra spanned by the 4 elements {1, i = e_{1}, j = e_{2}, k = e_{1}e_{2}} is the division ring of Hamilton's quaternions, H = Cl_{0,2}(R). One can therefore see that

$$\mathrm{Cl}_{0,3}(\mathbf{R}) \cong \mathbf{H} \otimes \mathbf{D}$$

where D = Cl_{1,0}(R) is the algebra spanned by {1, ω}, the algebra of the split-complex numbers. Equivalently,

$$\mathrm{Cl}_{0,3}(\mathbf{R}) \cong \mathbf{H} \oplus \mathbf{H}.$$

== Split-biquaternion group ==
The basis elements of split-biquaternions generate the group Q_{8} x C_{2}

The split-biquaternions form an associative ring as is clear from considering multiplications in its basis {1, ω, i, j, k, ωi, ωj, ωk}. When hyperbolic unit ω is adjoined to the quaternion group one obtains a 16 element group

( {1, i, j, k, −1, −i, −j, −k, ω, ωi, ωj, ωk, −ω, −ωi, −ωj, −ωk}, × ),

which is the internal direct product of the quaternion group and the cyclic group {1, ω} of order 2.

== Module ==
Since elements {1, i, j, k} of the quaternion group can be taken as a basis of the space of split-biquaternions, it may be compared to a vector space. But split-complex numbers form a ring, not a field, so vector space is not appropriate. Rather the space of split-biquaternions forms a free module. This standard term of ring theory expresses a similarity to a vector space, and this structure by Clifford in 1873 is an instance. Split-biquaternions form an algebra over a ring, but not a group ring.

== Direct sum of two quaternion rings ==
The direct sum of the division ring of quaternions with itself is denoted $\mathbf{H} \oplus \mathbf{H}$. The product of two elements $(a \oplus b)$ and $(c \oplus d)$ is $a c \oplus b d$ in this direct sum algebra.

Proposition: The algebra of split-biquaternions is isomorphic to $\mathbf{H} \oplus \mathbf{H}.$

proof: Every split-biquaternion has an expression q = w + z ω where w and z are quaternions and ω^{2} = +1. Now if p = u + v ω is another split-biquaternion, their product is

$$pq = uw + vz + (uz + vw) \omega .$$

The isomorphism mapping from split-biquaternions to $\mathbf{H} \oplus \mathbf{H}$ is given by

$$p \mapsto (u + v) \oplus (u - v) , \quad q \mapsto (w + z) \oplus (w - z).$$

In $\mathbf{H} \oplus \mathbf{H}$, the product of these images, according to the algebra-product of $\mathbf{H} \oplus \mathbf{H}$ indicated above, is

$$(u + v)(w + z) \oplus (u - v)(w - z).$$

This element is also the image of pq under the mapping into $\mathbf{H} \oplus \mathbf{H}.$ Thus the products agree, the mapping is a homomorphism; and since it is bijective, it is an isomorphism.

Though split-biquaternions form an eight-dimensional space like Hamilton's biquaternions, on the basis of the Proposition it is apparent that this algebra splits into the direct sum of two copies of the real quaternions.

== Hamilton biquaternion ==
The split-biquaternions should not be confused with the (ordinary) biquaternions previously introduced by William Rowan Hamilton. Hamilton's biquaternions are elements of the algebra

$$\mathrm{Cl}_{2}(\mathbf{C}) = \mathbf{H} \otimes \mathbf{C}.$$
$$\mathrm{Cl}_{3,0}(\mathbf{R}) = \mathbf{H} \otimes \mathbf{C}.$$

== Synonyms ==
The following terms and compounds refer to the split-biquaternion algebra:

- elliptic biquaternions – Clifford 1873, Rooney 2007
- Clifford biquaternion – Joly 1905, van der Waerden 1985
- dyquaternions – Rosenfeld 1997
- $\mathbf{D} \otimes \mathbf{H}$ where D = split-complex numbers – Bourbaki 2013, Rosenfeld 1997
- $\mathbf{H} \oplus \mathbf{H}$, the direct sum of two quaternion algebras – van der Waerden 1985

== See also ==
- Split-octonions
