= Georg Scheffers =

German mathematician (1866–1945)

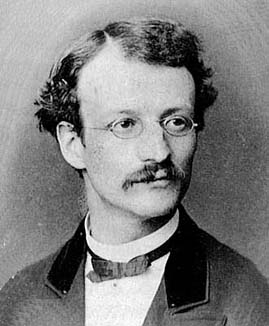

Georg Wilhelm Scheffers (21 November 1866 – 12 August 1945) was a German mathematician specializing in differential geometry.

== Life ==
Scheffers was born on 21 November 1866 in the village of Altendorf near Holzminden (today incorporated into Holzminden). Scheffers began his university career at the University of Leipzig where he studied with Felix Klein and Sophus Lie. Scheffers was a coauthor with Lie for three of the earliest expressions of Lie theory:

- Lectures on Differential equations with known Infinitesimal transformations (1893),
- Lectures on Continuous groups (1893), and
- Geometry of Contact Transformations (1896).

All three are now available online through archive.org.

In 1896 Scheffers became docent at Technische Hochschule Darmstadt (now TU Darmstadt), where he was raised to professor in 1900. From 1907 to 1935, when he retired, Scheffers was a professor at Technische Hochschule Berlin (now Technische Universität Berlin).

In 1901–1902 he published a famous two-volume textbook entitled Anwendung der Differential- und Integralrechnung auf die Geometrie (application of differential and integral calculus to geometry). The first volume subtitled Einführung in die Theorie der Curven in der Ebene und in Raum was published in 1901 and dealt with curves. The second volume subtitled Einführung in die Theorie der Flächen (introduction to the theory of surfaces) was published in 1902. A second edition was published in 1910 (volume 2, 1913), and a third edition in 1922.

In 1907 Scheffers published the first two volumes of his extensive revision and rewriting of Georg Bohlmann's 1897–1899 revision of Harnack's 1884 German translation of Serret's famous two-volume Cours de calcul différentiel et intégral, which was first published by Gauthier-Villars in 1868. In 1909 Scheffers published the third and last volume of his rewriting of Bohlman's version of Serret's two-volume work. For a new edition, Scheffers added an appendix with 46 pages of historical notes for the first and second volumes.

Another very successful book was prepared for students of science and technology: Lehrbuch der Mathematik (textbook of mathematics). It provided an introduction to analytic geometry as well as calculus of derivatives and integrals. In 1958 this book was republished for the fourteenth time.

Scheffers is known for an article on special transcendental curves (including W-curves) which appeared in the Enzyklopädie der mathematischen Wissenschaften in 1903: "Besondere transzendenten Kurven" (special transcendental curves). He wrote on translation surfaces for Acta Mathematica in 1904: "Das Abel'sche und das Lie'sche Theorem über Translationsflächen" (the theorem of Abel and Lie on translation surfaces).

Other books written by Scheffers are Lehrbuch der darstellenden Geometrie (textbook on descriptive geometry) (1919), Allerhand aus der zeichnenden Geometrie (1930), and Wie findet und zeichnet man Gradnetze von Land- und Sternkarten? (1934).

Georg Scheffers died 12 August 1945, in Berlin.

== Hypercomplex numbers ==
In 1891 Georg Scheffers contributed his article "Zurückführung komplexer Zahlensysteme auf typische Formen" to Mathematische Annalen (39:293–390). This article addressed a topic of considerable interest in the 1890s and contributed to the development of modern algebra. Scheffers distinguishes between a "Nichtquaternion system" (Nqss) and a Quaternion system (Qss). Scheffers characterizes the Qss as having three elements $e_1,\ e_2,\ e_3$ that satisfy (p 306)

$$e_1e_2-e_2e_1 = 2e_3, \quad e_2e_3-e_3e_2 = 2e_1, \quad e_3e_1-e_1e_3=2e_2.$$

In today's language, Scheffers' Qss has the quaternion algebra as a subalgebra.

Scheffers anticipates the concepts of direct product of algebras and direct sum of algebras with his section (p 317) on reducibility, addition, and multiplication of systems. Thus Scheffers pioneered the structural approach to algebra.

Though the article covers new ground with its exploration of Nqss, it is also a literature review going back to the work of Hermann Hankel. In §14 (p 386) Scheffers reviews both German and English authors on hypercomplex numbers. In particular, he cites Eduard Study’s work of 1889. For volume 41 of Mathematische Annalen Scheffers contributed a further short note, this time including reference to 1867 work by Edmond Laguerre on linear systems, a rich source of hypercomplex numbers.

== See also ==
- Scheffers conditions
