= Eric Zorn =

American journalist

Eric Zorn (born January 6, 1958) is an American former op-ed columnist and daily blogger for the Chicago Tribune who specialized in local news as well as politics.

== Early life and education ==
Zorn is a graduate of the University of Michigan, where he majored in English literature and creative writing.

He is the grandson of the mathematician Max Zorn, author of Zorn's lemma.

== Career ==
After serving a fourteen-month internship at the Miami Herald, Zorn started working for the Chicago Tribune in summer 1980. He became a columnist for it in 1986. About four times a year for some years, Zorn and fellow Tribune columnist Mary Schmich wrote a week of columns that consisted of a back-and-forth exchange of letters. Each December since 1999 (except during the COVID-19 pandemic in 2020), Schmich and Zorn have hosted the "Songs of Good Cheer" holiday caroling parties at the Old Town School of Folk Music to raise money for the Tribune Holiday Fund charities.

Zorn co-wrote the 1990 book Murder of Innocence, about Laurie Dann. The book served as the basis for a 1993 made-for-TV movie of the same name. From 2003, Zorn penned "Change of Subject", the Tribune's first blog.

When Alden Global Capital took control of the Chicago Tribune in the spring of 2021, Zorn was among the many columnists and other journalists who accepted a buyout offer from the company. His final column appeared on June 27, 2021. In September of that year he began writing The Picayune Sentinel, a newsletter named after the newsletter once published by his grandfather, Max Zorn.

== Political views ==
Zorn is Democratic and has stated, "I'm a Democrat because I think man-made climate change is real, that it's vile to discriminate against people because of their sexual orientation or gender identity, that access to quality health care should be a right, that the death penalty should be abolished, that income inequality should be diminished and that we shouldn't privatize public education. I'm a Democrat because I believe it should be hard to buy a gun—especially if you're on a law-enforcement watch list—and that every firearm should be registered, licensed and easily tracked ... organized labor and 'big government' interventions are needed to smooth out the roller-coaster ride of free-market capitalism."
