= Max August Zorn =

German mathematician (1906–1993)

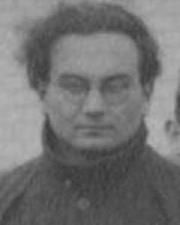
- Zorn in 1930
- Born: June 6, 1906; Krefeld, Rhenish Prussia, Germany
- Died: March 9, 1993 (aged 86); Bloomington, Indiana, U.S.
- Education: University of Hamburg
- Known for: Zorn ring Zorn's lemma Zorn's vector-matrix algebras Artin–Zorn theorem
- Scientific career
- Fields: Mathematics
- Workplaces: Indiana University; University of California, Los Angeles
- Thesis: Theorie Der Alternativen Ringe (1930)
- Doctoral advisor: Emil Artin
- Doctoral students: Israel Nathan Herstein

Max August Zorn (German: [tsɔʁn]; June 6, 1906 – March 9, 1993) was a German mathematician. He was an algebraist, group theorist, and numerical analyst. He is best known for Zorn's lemma, a method used in set theory that is applicable to a wide range of mathematical constructs such as vector spaces, and ordered sets amongst others. Zorn's lemma was first postulated by Kazimierz Kuratowski in 1922, and then independently by Zorn in 1935.

== Life and career ==
Zorn was born in Krefeld, Germany. He attended the University of Hamburg. He received his PhD in April 1930 for a thesis on alternative algebras. He published his findings in Abhandlungen aus dem Mathematischen Seminar der Universität Hamburg. Zorn showed that split-octonions could be represented by a mixed-style of matrices called Zorn's vector-matrix algebra.

Max Zorn was appointed to an assistant position at the University of Halle. However, he did not have the opportunity to work there for long as he was forced to leave Germany in 1933 because of policies enacted by the Nazis. According to grandson Eric, "[Max] spoke with a raspy, airy voice most of his life. Few people knew why, because he only told the story after significant prodding, but he talked that way because pro-Hitler thugs who objected to his politics had battered his throat in a 1933 street fight." Zorn had stood as a candidate on a socialist list for the AStA elections in Hamburg and was a member of the Communist Party of Germany.

Zorn immigrated to the United States and was appointed a Sterling Fellow at Yale University. While at Yale, Zorn wrote his paper "A Remark on Method in Transfinite Algebra" that stated his Maximum Principle, later called Zorn's lemma. It requires a set that contains the union of any chain of subsets to have one chain not contained in any other, called the maximal element. He illustrated the principle with applications in ring theory and field extensions. Zorn's lemma is an alternative expression of the axiom of choice, and thus a subject of interest in axiomatic set theory.

In 1936 he moved to UCLA and remained until 1946. While at UCLA Zorn revisited his study of alternative rings and proved the existence of the nilradical of certain alternative rings. According to Angus E. Taylor, Max was his most stimulating colleague at UCLA.

In 1946 Zorn became a professor at Indiana University, where he taught until retiring in 1971. He was thesis advisor for Israel Nathan Herstein.

Zorn died in Bloomington, Indiana, in March 1993, of congestive heart failure.

== Family ==
Max Zorn married Alice Schlottau and they had one son, Jens, and one daughter, Liz. Jens (June 19, 1931 — Jan. 5, 2026) was a professor of physics at the University of Michigan and an accomplished sculptor. Max Zorn's grandson Eric Zorn was a columnist for the Chicago Tribune from 1986 until 2021; after retirement Eric Zorn started a newsletter titled The Picayune Sentinel, named after the mathematics newsletter that his grandfather had distributed during his years at Indiana University. Max's great-grandson, Alexander Wolken Zorn, received a PhD in mathematics from the University of California Berkeley in 2018.
