= Hyperbolic orthogonality =

Relation of space and time in relativity theory

Euclidean orthogonality is preserved by rotation in the left diagram; hyperbolic orthogonality with respect to hyperbola (B) is preserved by hyperbolic rotation in the right diagram.

In geometry, given a pair of conjugate hyperbolas, two conjugate diameters are hyperbolically orthogonal. This relationship of diameters was described by Apollonius of Perga and has been modernized using analytic geometry. Hyperbolically orthogonal lines appear in special relativity as temporal and spatial directions that show the relativity of simultaneity.

Keeping time and space axes hyperbolically orthogonal, as in Minkowski space, gives a constant result when measurements are taken of the speed of light.

== Geometry ==
Two lines are hyperbolic orthogonal when they are reflections of each other over the asymptote of a given hyperbola. Two particular hyperbolas are frequently used in the plane:

1. xy = 1 with y = 0 as asymptote. When reflected in the x-axis, a line y = mx becomes y = −mx. In this case the lines are hyperbolic orthogonal if their slopes are additive inverses.
2. x^{2} − y^{2} = 1 with y = x as asymptote. For lines y = mx with −1 < m < 1, when x = 1/m, then y = 1. The point (1/m , 1) on the line is reflected across y = x to (1, 1/m). Therefore the reflected line has slope 1/m and the slopes of hyperbolic orthogonal lines are reciprocals of each other.

The relation of hyperbolic orthogonality actually applies to classes of parallel lines in the plane, where any particular line can represent the class. Thus, for a given hyperbola and asymptote A, a pair of lines (a, b) are hyperbolic orthogonal if there is a pair (c, d) such that $a \parallel c ,\ b \parallel d$, and c is the reflection of d across A.

Similar to the perpendularity of a circle radius to the tangent, a semi-diameter of a hyperbola is hyperbolic orthogonal to a tangent to the hyperbola.

A bilinear form is used to describe orthogonality in analytic geometry, with two elements orthogonal when their bilinear form vanishes. In the plane of complex numbers $z_1 =u + iv, \quad z_2 = x + iy$, the bilinear form is $xu + yv$, while in the plane of hyperbolic numbers $w_1 = u + jv,\quad w_2 = x +jy,$ the bilinear form is $xu - yv .$

The vectors z_{1} and z_{2} in the complex number plane, and w_{1} and w_{2} in the hyperbolic number plane are said to be respectively Euclidean orthogonal or hyperbolic orthogonal if their respective inner products [bilinear forms] are zero.

The bilinear form may be computed as the real part of the complex product of one number with the conjugate of the other. Then

$z_1 z_2^* + z_1^* z_2 = 0$ entails perpendicularity in the complex plane, while
$w_1 w_2^* + w_1^* w_2 = 0$ implies the w's are hyperbolic orthogonal.

The notion of hyperbolic orthogonality arose in analytic geometry in consideration of conjugate diameters of ellipses and hyperbolas. If g and g′ represent the slopes of the conjugate diameters, then $g g' = - \frac{b^2}{a^2}$ in the case of an ellipse and $g g' = \frac{b^2}{a^2}$ in the case of a hyperbola. When a = b the ellipse is a circle and the conjugate diameters are perpendicular while the hyperbola is rectangular and the conjugate diameters are hyperbolic-orthogonal.

In the terminology of projective geometry, the operation of taking the hyperbolic orthogonal line is an involution. Suppose the slope of a vertical line is denoted ∞ so that all lines have a slope in the projectively extended real line. Then whichever hyperbola (A) or (B) is used, the operation is an example of a hyperbolic involution where the asymptote is invariant. Hyperbolically orthogonal lines lie in different sectors of the plane, determined by the asymptotes of the hyperbola, thus the relation of hyperbolic orthogonality is a heterogeneous relation on sets of lines in the plane.

== Constant light speed ==
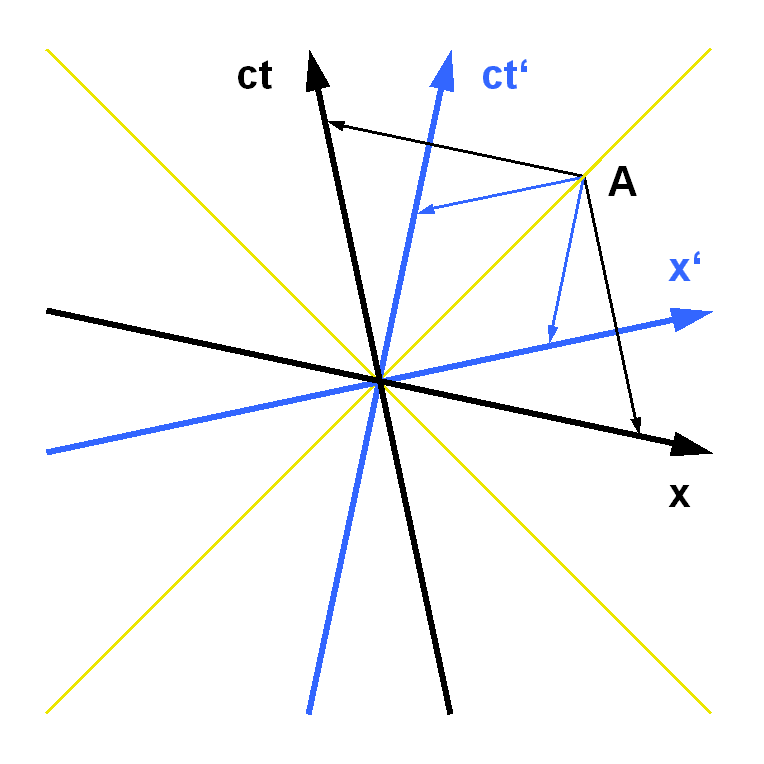
Both the blue and the black axes are hyperbolically-orthogonal, so speed of light (yellow) computes to the same value.

The second postulate of special relativity is that the speed of light does not depend on the inertial frame of reference in which the measurements are done. This postulate has been associated with null results in the Michaelson–Morley experiment. As long as space and time axes are hyperbolically orthogonal, the measurement of the speed of light will give the same result. The seeming paradox of light speed invariance with respect to moving observers is resolved in special relativity by this feature of Minkowski space.

== Simultaneity ==
Since Hermann Minkowski's foundation for spacetime study in 1908, the concept of points in a spacetime plane being hyperbolic-orthogonal to a timeline (tangent to a world line) has been used to define simultaneity of events relative to the timeline, or relativity of simultaneity. In Minkowski's development the hyperbola of type (B) above is in use. Two vectors (x_{1}, y_{1}, z_{1}, t_{1}) and (x_{2}, y_{2}, z_{2}, t_{2}) are normal (meaning hyperbolic orthogonal) when

$$c^{2} \ t_1 \ t_2 - x_1 \ x_2 - y_1 \ y_2 - z_1 \ z_2 = 0.$$

When c = 1 and the ys and zs are zero, x_{1} ≠ 0, t_{2} ≠ 0, then $\frac{c \ t_1}{x_1} = \frac{x_2}{c \ t_2}$.

Given a hyperbola with asymptote A, its reflection in A produces the conjugate hyperbola. Any diameter of the original hyperbola is reflected to a conjugate diameter. The directions indicated by conjugate diameters are taken for space and time axes in relativity. As E. T. Whittaker wrote in 1910, "[the] hyperbola is unaltered when any pair of conjugate diameters are taken as new axes, and a new unit of length is taken proportional to the length of either of these diameters." On this principle of relativity, he then wrote the Lorentz transformation in the modern form using rapidity.

Edwin Bidwell Wilson and Gilbert N. Lewis developed the concept within synthetic geometry in 1912. They note "in our plane no pair of perpendicular [hyperbolic-orthogonal] lines is better suited to serve as coordinate axes than any other pair"

== Relationship to Lorentz transformations ==
Hyperbolic orthogonality provides a direct geometric interpretation of Lorentz transformations. While a Euclidean rotation in the plane maintains orthogonal axes and preserves the equation of a circle ($x^2 + y^2 = r^2$), a Lorentz transformation acts as a hyperbolic rotation (or boost), preserving the invariant spacetime interval:

$$c^2t^2 - x^2 = s^2$$

=== Matrix representation ===
In linear algebra, if we represent a position in two-dimensional spacetime as a vector
$$\mathbf{X} = \begin{bmatrix} ct \\ x \end{bmatrix}$$
, the Lorentz transformation for a frame moving with velocity v along the x-axis is given by the matrix $\Lambda$:

$$\begin{bmatrix} ct' \\ x' \end{bmatrix} = \begin{bmatrix} \gamma & -\beta\gamma \\ -\beta\gamma & \gamma \end{bmatrix} \begin{bmatrix} ct \\ x \end{bmatrix}$$

where $\beta = \frac{v}{c}$ is the normalized velocity and $\gamma = \frac{1}{\sqrt{1 - \beta^2}}$ is the Lorentz factor.

=== Preservation of orthogonality ===
Consider a basis of unit vectors: a time-like vector
$$\mathbf{u} = \begin{bmatrix} 1 \\ 0 \end{bmatrix}$$
and a space-like vector
$$\mathbf{v} = \begin{bmatrix} 0 \\ 1 \end{bmatrix}$$
. These are hyperbolically orthogonal because their Minkowski inner product is zero:

$$\mathbf{u} \cdot \mathbf{v} = (1)(0) - (0)(1) = 0$$

Applying the Lorentz transformation $\Lambda$ to both vectors yields the transformed axes:

$$\mathbf{u'} = \Lambda \mathbf{u} = \begin{bmatrix} \gamma \\ -\beta\gamma \end{bmatrix}, \quad \mathbf{v'} = \Lambda \mathbf{v} = \begin{bmatrix} -\beta\gamma \\ \gamma \end{bmatrix}$$

The Minkowski inner product between the new axes $\mathbf{u'}$ and $\mathbf{v'}$ remains zero:

$$\mathbf{u'} \cdot \mathbf{v'} = (\gamma)(-\beta\gamma) - (-\beta\gamma)(\gamma) = 0$$

This demonstrates that the Lorentz transformation preserves the hyperbolic orthogonality of the coordinate axes, a geometric necessity to ensure the constancy of the speed of light for all inertial observers.
