= Quadratic algebra =

Algebraic structure in mathematics

In mathematics, a quadratic algebra is an algebra over a ring for which the algebra extends the ring by a new element that satisfies a monic, quadratic polynomial with coefficients in the ring.

There are free and graded quadratic algebras.

== Free quadratic algebras ==
Given a commutative ring R, and the ring of polynomials R[X], a free quadratic algebra may be defined as quotient ring by a polynomial ideal: "An R-algebra of the form R[X]/(X^{2} − a X − b) where X^{2} − a X − b is a monic quadratic polynomial in R[X] and (X^{2} − a X − b) Is the ideal it generates, is a free quadratic algebra over R."

Alternatively, a free quadratic extension of R is S = R ⊕ Rx with xx = ax + b for some a and b in R. Denote it S = (R, a, b).

Then (R, a, b) ≅ (R, c, d) iff there is a unit α and an element β of R such that

c = α(a − 2 β ) and
d = α^{2}(β a + b −β^{2}).

If R is taken as the ring Z of integers, then the quadratic algebra $\Z[X]/(X^2 + 1)$ is called the Gaussian integers.

If R is taken as the field of real numbers, then there are three isomorphism classes of $\R[X]/(X^2 - a X - b)$:

- if a^{2} + 4 b = 0, the dual numbers
- if a^{2} + 4 b > 0, the split-complex numbers
- if a^{2} + 4 b < 0, the complex numbers.

Suppose the quadratic algebra S has basis {1,z} and $z^2 = a z + b.$ Then an involution σ on S is given by $\sigma(z) = a - z,$ and if $x = \lambda + \mu z,$ then $\sigma(x) = \lambda + \mu a - \mu z.$

Trace and norm are then defined using the involution:

$$tr(x) = x + \sigma(x) = 2 \lambda + \mu a \in R ,$$
$$n(x) = x \sigma(x) = \lambda^2 - \lambda \mu a - \mu^2 b \in R.$$

== Graded quadratic algebras ==
A graded quadratic algebra A is determined by a vector space of generators V = A_{1} and a subspace of homogeneous quadratic relations S ⊂ V ⊗ V. Thus

$$A=T(V)/\langle S\rangle$$

and inherits its grading from the tensor algebra T(V).

If the subspace of relations is instead allowed to also contain inhomogeneous degree 2 elements, i.e. S ⊂ k ⊕ V ⊕ (V ⊗ V), this construction results in a filtered quadratic algebra.

A graded quadratic algebra A as above admits a quadratic dual: the quadratic algebra generated by V^{*} and with quadratic relations forming the orthogonal complement of S in V^{*} ⊗ V^{*}.

A quadratic algebra may be a filtered algebra generated by degree one elements, with defining relations of degree 2. It was pointed out by Yuri Manin that such algebras play an important role in the theory of quantum groups. The most important class of graded quadratic algebras is Koszul algebras.

A quadratic-linear algebra is an algebra over a field with a presentation such that all relations are sums of monomials of degrees 1 or 2 in the generators. They were introduced by Polishchuk and Positselski (2005, p.101). An example is the universal enveloping algebra of a Lie algebra, with generators a basis of the Lie algebra and relations of the form XY – YX – [X, Y] = 0.

== Examples ==
- The tensor algebra, symmetric algebra and exterior algebra of a finite-dimensional vector space are graded quadratic (in fact, Koszul) algebras.
- The universal enveloping algebra of a finite-dimensional Lie algebra is a filtered quadratic algebra.
- The Clifford algebra of a finite-dimensional vector space equipped with a quadratic form is a filtered quadratic algebra.
- The Weyl algebra of a finite-dimensional symplectic vector space is a filtered quadratic algebra.

== See also ==
- Algebraic element
- Algebraic extension
- Koszul algebra
- Poincaré–Birkhoff–Witt theorem
