= Identity component =

Concept in group theory

In mathematics, specifically group theory, the identity component of a group G (also known as its unity component) refers to several closely related notions of the largest connected subgroup of G containing the identity element.

In point set topology, the identity component of a topological group G is the connected component G^{0} of G that contains the identity element of the group. The identity path component of a topological group G is the path component of G that contains the identity element of the group.

In algebraic geometry, the identity component of an algebraic group G over a field k is the identity component of the underlying topological space. The identity component of a group scheme G over a base scheme S is, roughly speaking, the group scheme G^{0} whose fiber over the point s of S is the connected component G_{s}^{0} of the fiber G_{s}, an algebraic group.

== Properties ==
The identity component G^{0} of a topological or algebraic group G is a closed normal subgroup of G. It is closed since components are always closed. It is a subgroup since multiplication and inversion in a topological or algebraic group are continuous maps by definition. Moreover, for any continuous automorphism a of G we have

a(G^{0}) = G^{0}.

Thus, G^{0} is a characteristic (topological or algebraic) subgroup of G, so it is normal.

By the same argument as above, the identity path component of a topological group is also a normal subgroup (characteristic as a topological subgroup). It may in general be smaller than the identity component (since path connectedness is a stronger condition than connectedness), but these agree if G is locally path-connected.

The identity component G^{0} of a topological group G need not be open in G. In fact, we may have G^{0} = {e}, in which case G is totally disconnected. However, the identity component of a locally path-connected space (for instance a Lie group) is always open, since it contains a path-connected neighbourhood of {e}; and therefore is a clopen set.

== Component group ==
The quotient group G/G^{0} is called the group of components or component group of G. Its elements are just the connected components of G. The component group G/G^{0} is a discrete group if and only if G^{0} is open. If G is an algebraic group of finite type, such as an affine algebraic group, then G/G^{0} is actually a finite group.

One may similarly define the path component group as the group of path components (quotient of G by the identity path component), and in general the component group is a quotient of the path component group, but if G is locally path connected these groups agree. The path component group can also be characterized as the zeroth homotopy group, $\pi_0(G,e).$

== Examples ==
- The group of non-zero real numbers with multiplication (R*,•) has two components and the group of components is ({1,−1},•).
- Consider the group of units U in the ring of split-complex numbers. In the ordinary topology of the plane {z = x + j y : x, y ∈ R}, U is divided into four components by the lines y = x and y = − x where z has no inverse. Then U^{0} = { z : |y| < x } . In this case the group of components of U is isomorphic to the Klein four-group.
- The identity component of the additive group (Z_{p},+) of p-adic integers is the singleton set {0}, since Z_{p} is totally disconnected.
- The Weyl group of a reductive algebraic group G is the components group of the normalizer group of a maximal torus of G.
- Consider the group scheme μ_{2} = Spec(Z[x]/(x^{2} - 1)) of second roots of unity defined over the base scheme Spec(Z). Topologically, μ_{n} consists of two copies of the curve Spec(Z) glued together at the point (that is, prime ideal) 2. Therefore, μ_{n} is connected as a topological space, hence as a scheme. However, μ_{2} does not equal its identity component because the fiber over every point of Spec(Z) except 2 consists of two discrete points.

An algebraic group G over a topological field K admits two natural topologies, the Zariski topology and the topology inherited from K. The identity component of G often changes depending on the topology. For instance, the general linear group GL_{n}(R) is connected as an algebraic group but has two path components as a Lie group, the matrices of positive determinant and the matrices of negative determinant. Any connected algebraic group over a non-Archimedean local field K is totally disconnected in the K-topology and thus has trivial identity component in that topology.
