= Split-octonion =

Nonassociative algebra over the real numbers

In mathematics, the split-octonions are an 8-dimensional nonassociative algebra over the real numbers. Unlike the standard octonions, they contain non-zero elements which are non-invertible. Also the signatures of their quadratic forms differ: the split-octonions have a split signature (4,4) whereas the octonions have a positive-definite signature (8,0).

Up to isomorphism, the octonions and the split-octonions are the only two 8-dimensional composition algebras over the real numbers. They are also the only two octonion algebras over the real numbers. Split-octonion algebras analogous to the split-octonions can be defined over any field.

== Definition ==
=== Cayley–Dickson construction ===
The octonions and the split-octonions can be obtained from the Cayley–Dickson construction by defining a multiplication on pairs of quaternions. We introduce a new imaginary unit ℓ and write a pair of quaternions (a, b) in the form a + bℓ. The product is defined by the rule:

$$(a + b \ell)(c + d \ell) = (ac + \lambda \bar db) + (da + b\bar c)\ell$$

where

$$\lambda = \ell^2.$$

If λ is chosen to be −1, we get the octonions. If, instead, it is taken to be +1 we get the split-octonions. One can also obtain the split-octonions via a Cayley–Dickson doubling of the split-quaternions. Here either choice of λ (±1) gives the split-octonions.

=== Multiplication table ===
A mnemonic for the products of the split octonions.

A basis for the split-octonions is given by the set $\{\ 1,\ i,\ j,\ k,\ \ell,\ \ell i,\ \ell j,\ \ell k\ \}$.

Every split-octonion $x$ can be written as a linear combination of the basis elements,

$$x = x_0 + x_1\,i + x_2\,j + x_3\,k + x_4\,\ell + x_5\,\ell i + x_6\,\ell j + x_7\,\ell k,$$

with real coefficients $x_a$.

By linearity, multiplication of split-octonions is completely determined by the following multiplication table:

		multiplier							
		$1$	$i$	$j$	$k$	$\ell$	$\ell i$	$\ell j$	$\ell k$
multiplicand	$1$	$1$	$i$	$j$	$k$	$\ell$	$\ell i$	$\ell j$	$\ell k$
multiplicand	$i$	$i$	$-1$	$k$	$-j$	$-\ell i$	$\ell$	$-\ell k$	$\ell j$
multiplicand	$j$	$j$	$-k$	$-1$	$i$	$-\ell j$	$\ell k$	$\ell$	$-\ell i$
multiplicand	$k$	$k$	$j$	$-i$	$-1$	$-\ell k$	$-\ell j$	$\ell i$	$\ell$
multiplicand	$\ell$	$\ell$	$\ell i$	$\ell j$	$\ell k$	$1$	$i$	$j$	$k$
multiplicand	$\ell i$	$\ell i$	$-\ell$	$-\ell k$	$\ell j$	$-i$	$1$	$k$	$-j$
multiplicand	$\ell j$	$\ell j$	$\ell k$	$-\ell$	$-\ell i$	$-j$	$-k$	$1$	$i$
multiplicand	$\ell k$	$\ell k$	$-\ell j$	$\ell i$	$-\ell$	$-k$	$j$	$-i$	$1$

A convenient mnemonic is given by the diagram at the right, which represents the multiplication table for the split-octonions. This one is derived from its parent octonion (one of 480 possible), which is defined by:

$$e_i e_j = - \delta_{ij}e_0 + \varepsilon _{ijk} e_k,\,$$

where $\delta_{ij}$ is the Kronecker delta and $\varepsilon _{ijk}$ is the Levi-Civita symbol with value $+1$ when $ijk = 123, 154, 176, 264, 257, 374, 365,$ and:

$$e_ie_0 = e_0e_i = e_i;\,\,\,\,e_0e_0 = e_0 ,$$

with $e_0$ the scalar element, and $i, j, k = 1 ... 7.$

The red arrows indicate possible direction reversals imposed by negating the lower right quadrant of the parent creating a split octonion with this multiplication table.

=== Conjugate, norm and inverse ===
The conjugate of a split-octonion x is given by

$$\bar x = x_0 - x_1\,i - x_2\,j - x_3\,k - x_4\,\ell - x_5\,\ell i - x_6\,\ell j - x_7\,\ell k ,$$

just as for the octonions.

The quadratic form on x is given by

$$N(x) = \bar x x = (x_0^2 + x_1^2 + x_2^2 + x_3^2) - (x_4^2 + x_5^2 + x_6^2 + x_7^2) .$$

This quadratic form N(x) is an isotropic quadratic form since there are non-zero split-octonions x with N(x) = 0. With N, the split-octonions form a pseudo-Euclidean space of eight dimensions over R, sometimes written R^{4,4} to denote the signature of the quadratic form.

If N(x) ≠ 0, then x has a (two-sided) multiplicative inverse x^{−1} given by

$$x^{-1} = N(x)^{-1}{\bar x}.$$

== Properties ==
The split-octonions, like the octonions, are noncommutative and nonassociative. Also like the octonions, they form a composition algebra since the quadratic form N is multiplicative. That is,

$$N(xy) = N(x)N(y).$$

The split-octonions satisfy the Moufang identities and so form an alternative algebra. Therefore, by Artin's theorem, the subalgebra generated by any two elements is associative. The set of all invertible elements (i.e. those elements for which N(x) ≠ 0) form a Moufang loop.

The automorphism group of the split-octonions is a 14-dimensional Lie group, the split real form of the exceptional simple Lie group G_{2}.

== Zorn's vector-matrix algebra ==
Since the split-octonions are nonassociative they cannot be represented by ordinary matrices (matrix multiplication is always associative). Zorn found a way to represent them as "matrices" containing both scalars and vectors using a modified version of matrix multiplication. Specifically, define a vector-matrix to be a 2×2 matrix of the form

$$\begin{bmatrix}a & \mathbf v\\ \mathbf w & b\end{bmatrix} ,$$

where a and b are real numbers and v and w are vectors in R^{3}. Define multiplication of these matrices by the rule

$$\begin{bmatrix}a & \mathbf v\\ \mathbf w & b\end{bmatrix} \begin{bmatrix}a' & \mathbf v'\\ \mathbf w' & b'\end{bmatrix} = \begin{bmatrix}aa' + \mathbf v\cdot\mathbf w' & a\mathbf v' + b'\mathbf v + \mathbf w \times \mathbf w'\\ a'\mathbf w + b\mathbf w' - \mathbf v\times\mathbf v'  & bb' + \mathbf v'\cdot\mathbf w \end{bmatrix}$$

where · and × are the ordinary dot product and cross product of 3-vectors. With addition and scalar multiplication defined as usual the set of all such matrices forms a nonassociative unital 8-dimensional algebra over the reals, called Zorn's vector-matrix algebra.

Define the "determinant" of a vector-matrix by the rule

$$\det\begin{bmatrix}a & \mathbf v\\ \mathbf w & b\end{bmatrix} = ab - \mathbf v\cdot\mathbf w$$.

This determinant is a quadratic form on Zorn's algebra which satisfies the composition rule:

$$\det(AB) = \det(A)\det(B).\,$$

Zorn's vector-matrix algebra is, in fact, isomorphic to the algebra of split-octonions. Write an octonion $x$ in the form

$$x = (a + \mathbf v) + \ell(b + \mathbf w)$$

where $a$ and $b$ are real numbers and v and w are pure imaginary quaternions regarded as vectors in R^{3}. The isomorphism from the split-octonions to Zorn's algebra is given by

$$x\mapsto \phi(x) = \begin{bmatrix}a + b & \mathbf v + \mathbf w \\ -\mathbf v + \mathbf w & a - b\end{bmatrix}.$$

This isomorphism preserves the norm since $N(x) = \det(\phi(x))$.

== Applications ==
Split-octonions are used in the description of physical law. For example:

- The Dirac equation in physics (the equation of motion of a free spin 1/2 particle, e.g. an electron or a proton) can be expressed on native split-octonion arithmetic.
- Supersymmetric quantum mechanics has an octonionic extension.
- The Zorn-based split-octonion algebra can be used in modeling local gauge symmetric SU(3) quantum chromodynamics.
- The problem of a ball rolling without slipping on a ball of radius 3 times as large has the split real form of the exceptional group G_{2} as its symmetry group, because this problem can be described using split-octonions.
