= Bicomplex number =

Commutative, associative algebra of two complex dimensions

In abstract algebra, a bicomplex number is a pair (w, z) of complex numbers constructed by the Cayley–Dickson process that defines the bicomplex conjugate $(w,z)^* = (w, -z)$, and the product of two bicomplex numbers as

$$(u,v)(w,z) = (u w - v z, u z + v w).$$

Then the bicomplex norm is given by

$(w,z)^* (w,z) = (w, -z)(w,z) = (w^2 + z^2, 0),$ a quadratic form in the first component.

The bicomplex numbers form a commutative algebra over C of dimension two that is isomorphic to the direct sum of algebras C ⊕ C.

The product of two bicomplex numbers yields a quadratic form value that is the product of the individual quadratic forms of the numbers: a verification of this property of the quadratic form of a product refers to the Brahmagupta–Fibonacci identity. This property of the quadratic form of a bicomplex number indicates that these numbers form a composition algebra. In fact, bicomplex numbers arise at the binarion level of the Cayley–Dickson construction based on $\mathbb{C}$ with norm z^{2}.

The general bicomplex number can be represented by the matrix
$$\begin{pmatrix}w & iz \\ iz & w \end{pmatrix}$$
, which has determinant $w^2 + z^2$. Thus, the composing property of the quadratic form concurs with the composing property of the determinant.

Bicomplex numbers feature two distinct imaginary units. Multiplication being associative and commutative, the product of these imaginary units must have positive one for its square. Such an element as this product has been called a hyperbolic unit.

== As a real algebra ==
Tessarine multiplication
×	1	i	j	k
1	1	i	j	k
i	i	−1	k	−j
j	j	k	1	i
k	k	−j	i	−1

Bicomplex numbers form an algebra over C of dimension two, and since C is of dimension two over R, the bicomplex numbers are an algebra over R of dimension four. In fact the real algebra is older than the complex one; it was labelled tessarines in 1848 while the complex algebra was not introduced until 1892.

A basis for the tessarine 4-algebra over R uses the following units (with matrix representations given): the multiplicative identity
$$1 = \begin{pmatrix} 1 & 0 \\ 0 & 1 \end{pmatrix}$$
, the same imaginary unit
$$i = \begin{pmatrix} i & 0 \\ 0 & i \end{pmatrix}$$
as in the complex numbers, the same hyperbolic unit
$$j = \begin{pmatrix} 0 & 1 \\ 1 & 0 \end{pmatrix}$$
as in the split-complex numbers and a second imaginary unit, which multiply according to the table given.

== History ==
The subject of multiple imaginary units was examined in the 1840s. In a long series "On quaternions, or on a new system of imaginaries in algebra" beginning in 1844 in Philosophical Magazine, William Rowan Hamilton communicated a system multiplying according to the quaternion group. In 1848 Thomas Kirkman reported on his correspondence with Arthur Cayley regarding equations on the units determining a system of hypercomplex numbers.

=== Tessarines ===
In 1848 James Cockle introduced the tessarines in a series of articles in Philosophical Magazine.

A tessarine is a hypercomplex number of the form

$$t = w + x i + y j + z k, \quad w, x, y, z \in \mathbb{R}$$

where $i j = j i = k, \quad i^2 = -1, \quad j^2 = +1 .$ Cockle used tessarines to isolate the hyperbolic cosine series and the hyperbolic sine series in the exponential series. He also showed how zero divisors arise in tessarines, inspiring him to use the term "impossibles". The tessarines are now best known for their subalgebra of real tessarines $t = w + y j \$, also called split-complex numbers, which express the parametrization of the unit hyperbola.

=== Bicomplex numbers ===
Bicomplex number multiplication
×	1	h	i	hi
1	1	h	i	hi
h	h	−1	hi	−i
i	i	hi	−1	−h
hi	hi	−i	−h	1

In an 1892 Mathematische Annalen paper, Corrado Segre introduced bicomplex numbers, which form an algebra isomorphic to the tessarines.

Segre read W. R. Hamilton's Lectures on Quaternions (1853) and the works of W. K. Clifford. Segre used some of Hamilton's notation to develop his system of bicomplex numbers: Let h and i be elements that square to −1 and that commute. Then, presuming associativity of multiplication, the product hi must square to +1. The algebra constructed on the basis { 1, h, i, hi } is then the same as James Cockle's tessarines, represented using a different basis. Segre noted that elements

$g = (1 - hi)/2, \quad g' = (1 + hi)/2$ are idempotents.

When bicomplex numbers are expressed in terms of the basis { 1, h, i, −hi }, their equivalence with tessarines is apparent, particularly if the vectors in this basis are reordered as { 1, i, −hi, h }. Looking at the linear representation of these isomorphic algebras shows agreement in the fourth dimension when the negative sign is used; consider the sample product given above under linear representation.

=== Bibinarions ===
The modern theory of composition algebras positions the algebra as a binarion construction based on another binarion construction, hence the bibinarions. The unarion level in the Cayley-Dickson process must be a field, and starting with the real field, the usual complex numbers arises as division binarions, another field. Thus the process can begin again to form bibinarions. Kevin McCrimmon noted the simplification of nomenclature provided by the term binarion in his text A Taste of Jordan Algebras (2004).

== Polynomial roots ==
Write ^{2}C = C ⊕ C and represent elements of it by ordered pairs (u,v) of complex numbers. Since the algebra of tessarines T is isomorphic to ^{2}C, the rings of polynomials T[X] and ^{2}C[X] are also isomorphic, however polynomials in the latter algebra split:

$$\sum_{k=1}^n (a_k, b_k ) (u, v)^k \quad = \quad \left({\sum_{k=1}^n a_i u^k},\quad  \sum_{k=1}^n b_k v^k \right).$$

In consequence, when a polynomial equation $f(u,v) = (0,0)$ in this algebra is set, it reduces to two polynomial equations on C. If the degree is n, then there are n roots for each equation: $u_1, u_2, \dots, u_n,\ v_1, v_2, \dots, v_n .$ Any ordered pair $( u_i, v_j ) \!$ from this set of roots will satisfy the original equation in ^{2}C[X], so it has n^{2} roots.

Due to the isomorphism with T[X], there is a correspondence of polynomials and a correspondence of their roots. Hence the tessarine polynomials of degree n also have n^{2} roots, counting multiplicity of roots.

== Applications ==
Bicomplex number appears as the center of CAPS (complexified algebra of physical space), which is Clifford algebra $Cl(3,\mathbb{C})$. Since the linear space of CAPS can be viewed as the four dimensional space span {$1, e_1, e_2, e_3$} over {$1,i,k,j$}.

Tessarines have been applied in digital signal processing.

Bicomplex numbers are employed in fluid mechanics. The use of bicomplex algebra reconciles two distinct applications of complex numbers: the representation of two-dimensional potential flows in the complex plane and the complex exponential function.
