= Isotopy =

Isotopy may refer to:

== Mathematics ==
- Isotopy, a continuous path of homeomorphisms connecting two given homeomorphisms is an isotopy of the two given homeomorphisms in homotopy
- Regular isotopy of a link diagram, an equivalence relation in knot theory
- Ambient isotopy (or h-isotopy), two subsets of a fixed topological space are ambient isotopic if there is a homeomorphism, isotopic to the identity map of the ambient space, which carries one subset to the other
- Isotopy of quasigroups. See Quasigroup#Homotopy and isotopy.
- Isotopy of loops, a triple of maps with certain properties.
- Isotopy of an algebra, a triple of maps with certain properties.

== Semiotics ==
- Isotopy, a repetition of a basic meaning-trait (seme); the direction taken by an interpretation of the text

== See also ==
- Isotopic (disambiguation)
- Isotope (disambiguation)
