= Isotope (disambiguation) =

Isotopes are any of the several different forms of an element each having different atomic mass (mass number).

Isotope may also refer to:

- Isotope (band), a British jazz-rock band (1972–1976)
- Isotope (album), a 1983 album by jazz pianist Kirk Lightsey
- Isotope (catamaran), an American sailboat design
- Albuquerque Isotopes, a minor league baseball team of the Pacific Coast League
- Springfield Isotopes, a fictional baseball team in the TV show The Simpsons
- Isotopes Punk Rock Baseball Club, a Canadian baseball-themed punk rock band
- Isotope 217, a jazz band from Chicago, United States
- Isotope 244, a video game developer based in the USA
- Isotope (Jordan algebra) in mathematics, a method of modifying the product on a Jordan algebra
- An isotope of an algebra: see Isotopy of algebras
- An isotope of a loop or quasigroup: see Isotopy of loops
- Isotope, a minor antagonist from the comic series Invincible (comics) and its TV adaptation Invincible (TV series)

== See also ==
- Isotone
- Isotropy, an unrelated concept
- Isotype (disambiguation)
- iZotope, Inc., an audio technology company
- Category:Lists of isotopes by element
