= Simi Valley High School =

Location
- 5400 Cochran Street; Simi Valley, California 93063; United States; 34°16′42″N 118°41′05″W

Information
- Type: Public high school
- Established: 1920; 106 years ago
- School district: Simi Valley Unified School District
- Principal: John C. Baxter
- Teaching staff: 81.41 (FTE)
- Grades: 9–12
- Enrollment: 1,921 (2023–2024)
- Student to teacher ratio: 23.60
- Campus: Suburban: midsize
- Colors: Maroon; Gold
- Athletics conference: CIF Southern Section; Coastal Canyon League
- Mascot: Herman, or Hermie, the Pioneer
- Nickname: Pioneers
- Rival: Royal Highlanders
- USNWR ranking: 5,776 (2021)
- Website: svhs.simivalleyusd.org

Simi Valley High School (SVHS) is a public high school in Simi Valley, California. The school is part of the Simi Valley Unified School District and is located on the east side of the city.

== History ==
Simi Valley High School was established in 1920 as the first high school in Simi Valley.

The campus has undergone several configurations over the years to become the 50.4-acre (204,000 m^{2}) campus it is today. The current campus was built in three phases during the 1960s. Based on the physical concept of "schools-within-a-school," Simi Valley High School was constructed with three instructional quads, each having an administrative area. The original design also included one main administration building. Currently, the school is configured with five major instructional areas, a multipurpose building, a gym and dressing room facilities, a library, a counseling facility, an administration building, a new area of portable classrooms, a stadium and athletic fields, a new senior patio, and a band room with all different types of instruments.

== Academics ==
In the annual public high school rankings from U.S. News & World Report, Simi Valley High School was ranked in 2021 as the 17th best high school in the Oxnard-Ventura metropolitan area, with an overall score of 67.65 out of 100. That makes it the 3rd best high school in the Simi Valley Unified School District, behind Santa Susana High School and Royal High School.

== Demographics ==
Enrollment by Race/Ethnicity
School Year	Enrollment	American Indian / Alaska Native	Asian	Black	Hispanic	Native Hawaiian / Pacific Islander	White	Two or More Races
2018–19	2,129	6 (0.3%)	234 (11%)	18 (0.8%)	655 (30.8%)	3 (0.1%)	1,145 (53.8%)	68 (3.2%)
2019–20	2,107	6 (0.3%)	235 (11.2%)	25 (1.2%)	693 (32.9%)	3 (0.1%)	1,083 (51.4%)	62 (2.9%)
2021–22	1,967	4 (0.2%)	208 (10.6%)	29 (1.5%)	714 (36.3%)	4 (0.2%)	931 (47.3%)	76 (3.9%)
2022–23	1,935	2 (0.1%)	185 (9.6%)	29 (1.5%)	730 (37.7%)	3 (0.2%)	904 (46.7%)	80 (4.1%)

== Athletics ==
Simi Valley High School's athletic teams are nicknamed the Pioneers, and the school's mascot is Herman, or Hermie, the Pioneer, established around 1940. The school's colors are maroon and gold; originally, the colors were purple and silver but these were changed in the mid-1920s. The school is a charter member of the Coastal Canyon League (CCL), a conference within the CIF Southern Section (CIF-SS) that was established in 2014. SVHS competes in the CCL for all sports except football and in the Marmonte Football Association for football. Prior to 2014, the school was a long-time member of the Marmonte League. Simi Valley's primary rival is Royal High School on the west side of the city.

== Notable alumni ==
=== Acting ===
- Jenna Leigh Green, actress, Sabrina the Teenage Witch, Wicked musical.
- Danielle Savre, actress, Station 19, Deep Blue Sea 2, Bring It On, director, Heard, Station 19
- Shailene Woodley, actress, The Secret Life of the American Teenager, The Descendants, The Fault in Our Stars, Divergent

=== Music ===
- Rick Coonce, drummer, The Grass Roots
- Scott Radinsky, singer, Ten Foot Pole and Pulley; drummer, Scared Straight.

=== Politics ===
- Cara Hunter, Northern Irish politician

=== Sports ===
- Bryan Anderson, former Major League Baseball catcher
- Justin Campbell, pitcher in the Cleveland Guardians organization
- Tom Herman, college football coach, formerly at University of Texas and Florida Atlantic University
- Justin Huish, 1996 Gold Medal Winner, Atlanta Olympic Games
- Tim Laker, former Major League Baseball catcher
- Don MacLean, all-time UCLA Bruins men's basketball scoring leader and NBA player
- Ben Orloff, Minor League Baseball player
- Scott Radinsky, former Major League Baseball pitcher
- Beau Sandland, NFL tight end
- Bob Skube, retired Major League Baseball player
- Jeff Weaver, former Major League Baseball pitcher
- Jered Weaver, former Major League Baseball pitcher

=== Writing ===
- David Farley, food and travel writer
