= Mutation (algebra) =

In the theory of algebras over a field, mutation is a construction of a new binary operation related to the multiplication of the algebra. In specific cases the resulting algebra may be referred to as a homotope or an isotope of the original.

== Definitions ==
Let A be an algebra over a field F with multiplication (not assumed to be associative) denoted by juxtaposition. For an element a of A, define the left a-homotope $A(a)$ to be the algebra with multiplication

$$x * y = (xa)y. \,$$

Similarly define the left (a,b) mutation $A(a,b)$

$$x * y = (xa)y - (yb)x. \,$$

Right homotope and mutation are defined analogously. Since the right (p,q) mutation of A is the left (−q, −p) mutation of the opposite algebra to A, it suffices to study left mutations.

If A is a unital algebra and a is invertible, we refer to the isotope by a.

== Properties ==
- If A is associative then so is any homotope of A, and any mutation of A is Lie-admissible.
- If A is alternative then so is any homotope of A, and any mutation of A is Malcev-admissible.
- Any isotope of a Hurwitz algebra is isomorphic to the original.
- A homotope of a Bernstein algebra by an element of non-zero weight is again a Bernstein algebra.

== Jordan algebras ==
A Jordan algebra is a commutative algebra satisfying the Jordan identity $(xy)(xx) = x(y(xx))$. The Jordan triple product is defined by

$$\{a,b,c\}=(ab)c+(cb)a -(ac)b. \,$$

For y in A the mutation or homotope A^{y} is defined as the vector space A with multiplication

$$a\circ b= \{a,y,b\}. \,$$

and if y is invertible this is referred to as an isotope. A homotope of a Jordan algebra is again a Jordan algebra: isotopy defines an equivalence relation. If y is nuclear then the isotope by y is isomorphic to the original.
