= Scott Radinsky =

American baseball player, coach and musician (born 1968)

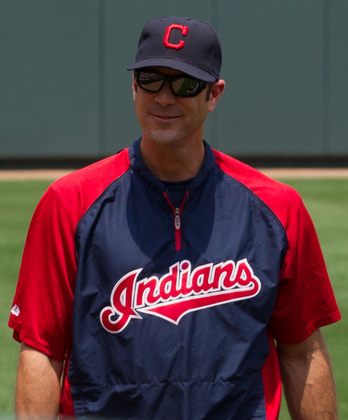
- Radinsky as Cleveland Indians pitching coach in 2009
- Pitcher
- Born: March 3, 1968 (age 58); Glendale, California, U.S.
- Batted: Left Threw: Left

MLB debut
- April 9, 1990, for the Chicago White Sox

Last MLB appearance
- October 5, 2001, for the Cleveland Indians

MLB statistics
- Win–loss record: 42–25
- Earned run average: 3.44
- Strikeouts: 358
- Stats at Baseball Reference

Teams
- As player: Chicago White Sox (1990–1993, 1995); Los Angeles Dodgers (1996–1998); St. Louis Cardinals (1999–2000); Cleveland Indians (2001); As coach: Cleveland Indians (2009–2012); Los Angeles Angels (2016–2018)

Scott David Radinsky (born March 3, 1968) is an American left-handed former relief pitcher in Major League Baseball, who had an 11-year career from 1990–1993 and 1995–2001. Radinsky is also the lead singer of the punk rock band Pulley, former lead singer of the band Ten Foot Pole and former co-owner of a skatepark that housed the Skateboarding Hall of Fame.

Radinsky finished his playing career with a 42–25 record, a 3.44 ERA, and 358 strikeouts in 481 2/3 innings pitched. Radinsky also only gave up 33 home runs throughout his career, an average of 1 every 14.5 innings. He won the 1995 Tony Conigliaro Award.

== Early life ==
Radinsky was born in Glendale, California, later lived in Simi Valley, California. His father is from West Virginia, and his mother is from Boston. His mother is Jewish but Radinsky himself does not identify as Jewish.

He graduated from Simi Valley High School, for whom he played baseball in 1986. In his senior year in high school, he was 14–1 with an ERA of 0.72, and had 180 strikeouts in 100.1 innings.

== Baseball career ==
Radinsky was drafted by the Chicago White Sox at the age of 18 in the third round in 1986 out of Simi Valley High School.

=== Minor leagues ===
Radinsky pitched in the minor leagues from 1986–1989, and parts of later years. In 1989, he had 31 saves, a 1.75 ERA, and averaged 5.7 hits allowed and 12.1 strikeouts per nine innings pitched as he was voted a Midwest League All Star.

=== Chicago White Sox ===
He made his major league debut for the White Sox on April 9, 1990, retiring the one batter he faced (Greg Brock of the Milwaukee Brewers) on a pop up to the shortstop. He was the first pitcher in six years—since Dwight Gooden—to go straight from Single A to the major leagues. He picked up the win with 1 1/3 innings of relief the following day. He was unconventional; he blasted punk music in the clubhouse, rode his bicycle to and from Comiskey Park, was a fan favorite, and was known as his teammates as "Rad." He told a sportswriter:

I love the five minutes I'm actually in the game. Those five minutes are why I come to the ballpark and put up with the writers, the dress code, the team meetings, the authority of the dugout, the major corporation that is baseball.

In 1990, he posted a record of 6–1 with four saves in his rookie season.

From that point through 1993, he was a fixture in a White Sox bullpen that also included hardthrowing Bobby Thigpen and Roberto Hernández.

In 1991, Radinsky enjoyed his finest year with the White Sox, going 5–5 with 8 saves and a 2.02 ERA. He was 10th in the league with 67 appearances. He held batters to a .116 batting average with runners in scoring position.

In 1992, he was seventh in the AL, pitching in 68 games, and had a 2.73 ERA and a career-high 15 saves. In 1993, he was second in the league, pitching in 73 games, and won a career-high eight games while saving four.

During the 1993–94 off-season, he was diagnosed with Hodgkin's Disease, a type of lymphoma. The treatment for the disease forced Radinsky to miss the entire 1994 baseball season. He remembered:

Oh, it sucks to have a doctor tell you that you have cancer, but in the same breath, he told me that with aggressive treatment they can treat this particular disease. Thank God I didn't have Internet back then, so I couldn't get all wrapped up in it. I didn't have access to see how bad it could be. They told me I had to go through six months of this and five weeks of that, and that's all I really looked at: the end.

He underwent surgery at Sarasota Memorial Hospital, and months of radiation therapy and chemotherapy. During spring training in 1994 his White Sox teammates wore a patch of Radinsky's number 31 on their jersey.

In his 1995 return to the White Sox, his ERA ballooned to 5.45, prompting the White Sox to release him after the season. In December 1995 Radinsky was honored with the Tony Conigliaro Award.

=== Los Angeles Dodgers ===
His release from the Sox paved the way for his return home to Southern California to play for the Los Angeles Dodgers, with whom he signed as a free agent in January 1996. He enjoyed three excellent years (1996–98) in Los Angeles, with his ERA never exceeding 2.89. Out of the bullpen, he worked as a set-up pitcher for Todd Worrell and Jeff Shaw, the Dodgers' closers. Radinsky's home-town status, excellent on-the-field performance, blue collar attitude, and at times fiery personality made him an instant fan favorite in Los Angeles. For the 1996 season, he was 5-1 with a 2.41 ERA.

In 1997, he pitched in a career-high 75 games, 7th in the NL, and was 5-1 with a 2.89 ERA. However, after the 1998 season, in which he was 6-6 with 13 saves and a 2.63 ERA, the Dodgers and Radinsky decided to cut ties.

=== St. Louis Cardinals ===
Radinsky went on to play for the St. Louis Cardinals, with whom he signed as a free agent in November 1998. He was in 43 games in 1999, with a 4.88 ERA.

=== Cleveland Indians ===
He then pitched for the Cleveland Indians, with whom he signed as a free agent in January 2001. He injured his pitching elbow in his first game with the Indians, requiring Tommy John surgery. After rehabilitating the elbow, he then returned to make two major league appearances in 2001 before retiring. He played his final major league game for the Indians on October 5, 2001, and retired in early 2002, at 34 years of age.

=== Coaching career ===
Radinsky rejoined the Cleveland Indians organization in 2005 as a pitching coach for the South Atlantic League's Lake County Captains. He held the same post in 2006 with the Double-A Akron Aeros. In 2007, he was promoted by the Indians to serve as the pitching coach for the Buffalo Bisons. in 2009 he was the coach of the Columbus Clippers for the third straight season.

On November 16, 2009, Radinsky was named as bullpen coach for the Indians major league club for the 2010 season.

On October 14, 2011, it was announced that Radinsky would be promoted to pitching coach for the Indians for the 2012 season, to replace Tim Belcher who stepped down at season's end to spend more time with his family. On August 9, 2012, the Indians fired Radinsky and replaced him with Ruben Niebla, from their Triple-A affiliate, the Columbus Clippers, on an interim basis.

On January 23, 2013, Radinsky was hired as the pitching coach for the Ogden Raptors, a Rookie-level affiliate of the Los Angeles Dodgers, playing in the Pioneer League. He was promoted to pitching coach for the Double-A Chattanooga Lookouts in 2014, and again in 2015 to pitching coach for the AAA Oklahoma City Dodgers.

He became the bullpen coach for the Los Angeles Angels in 2016. A position he held through the 2018 season.

In October 2023, Radinsky became the head coach for the Dutch club UVV Utrecht. After the team finished last in the Honkbal Hoofdklasse, he left the team after the 2024 season.

== Music career ==
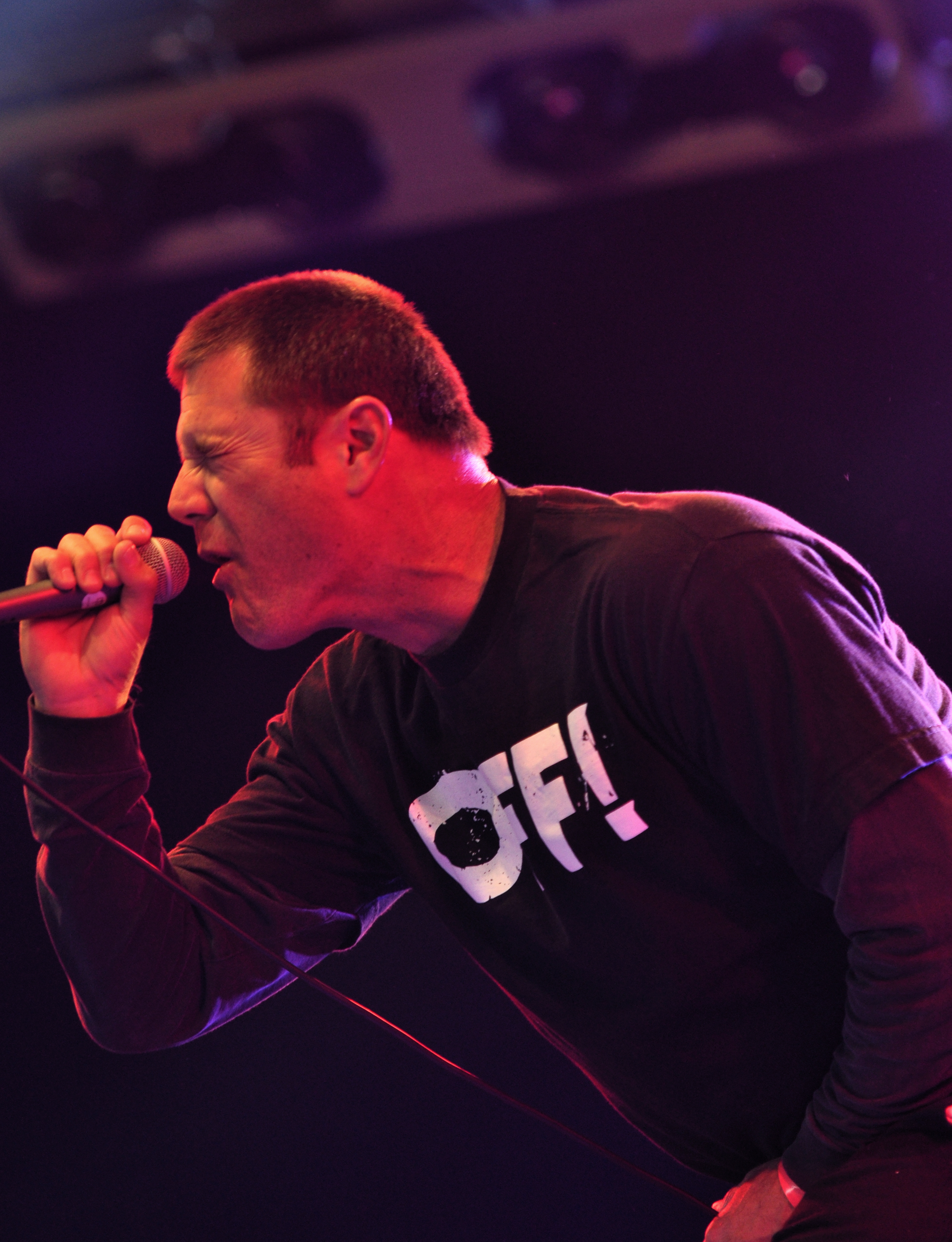
Scott Radinsky with Pulley, Groezrock 2013

Radinsky has also been active in punk rock. A fixture in the 1980s "Nardcore" (Oxnard, California hardcore) scene, he sang for Scared Straight, which recorded an LP ("You Drink, You Drive, You Die") and several compilation cuts for Mystic Records. The band later changed their name to Ten Foot Pole and after recording two albums, in 1995 parted ways with Radinsky, due to his time-consuming baseball career.

Since 1994, Radinsky has been the lead vocalist for the punk rock band Pulley, which has toured three continents and opened for bands such as Green Day. In 2017, he was featured in Baseball Punx, a documentary exploring the intersection between baseball and punk rock. Describing his life mixing both baseball and punk, he said:

"I don't think some of the guys [in Pulley] realized that I was on an eight-month tour [playing and coaching baseball] every day from February until October, and then I'd come home and a couple of weeks later we'd go out on a three-week European tour playing a gig every single day."

== Discography ==
with Scared Straight

- Nardcore Compilation LP (Mystic Records, 1984)
- Party Animal - We got Power II Compilation LP (Mystic Records, 1984)
- Mystic Super Seven Sampler No. 1 Compilation 7" (Mystic Records, 1985)
- Born to be Wild" 7 (Mystic Records, 1985)
- You Drink, You Drive, You Die LP (Mystic Records, 1988)

with Ten Foot Pole

- Swill (Ten Foot Records, 1993)
- Rev (Epitaph Records, 1994)
- Ten Foot Pole & Satanic Surfers Split EP (Bad Taste Records, 1995)

with Pulley

- Esteem Driven Engine (Epitaph Records, 1996)
- 60 Cycle Hum (Epitaph Records, 1997)
- @#!* (Epitaph Records, 1999)
- Together Again for the First Time (Epitaph Records, 2001)
- Matters (Epitaph Records, 2004)
- The Slackers/Pulley Split (Do Tell Records, 2004)
- Beyond Warped: Live Music Series (Immergent Records, 2005)
- Time-Insensitive Material (Whens Lunch Records, 2009)
- The Long And The Short Of It (Whens Lunch Records, 2011)
- No Change in the Weather (Cyber Tracks, 2016)
- The Golden Life (Sbäm Records, 2022)

== Skatepark ==
Radinsky co-founded owned Skatelab in Simi Valley, California from its opening in 1997 until its closure in January 2019. The skatepark housed a comprehensive skateboarding museum displaying pieces from all eras of skateboarding, including many rare and collectible skateboards, and the Skateboarding Hall of Fame.

== Personal life ==
Radinsky married his wife, who is from Caracas, Venezuela, on June 7, 1992. She is the sister-in-law of his former teammate Ozzie Guillén. They have three children. Radinsky currently resides in Thousand Oaks, California.
