= SO8 =

SO8 may refer to:

- code for Forensic Science Laboratory in the Specialist Operations, a directorate of the Metropolitan Police
- 6639 Marchis (1989 SO8), a Main-belt Asteroid discovered on September 25, 1989

So8 may refer to:

- code for Withypool during the Survey of English Dialects

and also :

- SO(8), the special orthogonal group acting on eight-dimensional Euclidean space in mathematics
- SO8, an Integrated Circuit packaging technology. See Small-outline integrated circuit.
