= Baseball Punx =

- Film poster
- Directed by: Jak Kerley
- Produced by: Jak Kerley; Taber Allen
- Starring: Scott Radinsky; Steve Sladkowski; John DeDomenici; Alyssa Kai; Evan October
- Distributed by: Shibby Pictures
- Release date: October 17, 2017
- Running time: 12 minutes
- Country: United States
- Language: English

Baseball Punx is a short American documentary about the intersection of baseball and punk rock directed by Jak Kerley.

== Outline ==
Baseball Punx was shot over a two-year period, primarily by Jak Kerley with a very small crew. The film begins by comparing similarities and differences between punk rock and baseball, then continues to dig in on the political influence they have over their respective fan bases.

== Appearances ==
The following people appear in the documentary.

- Scott Radinsky (vocalist for Pulley, Bullpen coach for Los Angeles Angels)
- Steve Sladkowski (guitarist for PUP)
- John DeDomenici (bassist for Bomb the Music Industry! and Jeff Rosenstock)
- Alyssa Kai (clarinet for Ramshackle Glory)
- Rob Taxpayer (guitarist and vocalist for The Taxpayers)
- Evan October (vocalist for Isotopes)
- Brandon Moody (guitarist for lull)
- Denise V (co-founder of Fistolo Records)
- Vince Caffiero
- Wayne Borders

== Reception ==
Baseball Punx was taken on tour for a series on screenings at a variety of venues, with its first premiere being in New Zealand, and tours continuing to Australia, and most of the United States.

By the time the touring was complete, it had picked up considerable international media attention, which resulted in it being premiered on ESPN one day before its expected release date.
