= Swill (disambiguation) =

Swill may also refer to:

- Pig swill
- Swill (album), an album by Ten Foot Pole
- Philip "Swill" Odgers, singer with The Men They Couldn't Hang
- Six o'clock swill
- Swill Brook, a number of streams in England
