= Rev (Ten Foot Pole album) =

Studio album by Ten Foot Pole
- Released: 1994
- Recorded: 1994
- Genre: Skate punk; punk rock
- Length: 33:02
- Label: Epitaph
- Producer: Sally Browder and Ten Foot Pole

Ten Foot Pole chronology
Swill (1993)	Rev (1994)	Ten Foot Pole & Satanic Surfers (1995)

Rev is the second album by Ten Foot Pole, and the last to feature Scott Radinsky on vocals as the other members wanted the band to become a full time touring band due to the album’s success and his baseball career was getting in the way of that. He would form Pulley shortly after this. A music video was filmed for the song “Broken Bubble”.

== Track listing ==
1. "Never Look Back" - 2:20
2. "My Wall" - 2:50
3. "Old Man" - 3:44
4. "Fade Away" - 3:11
5. "World's Best Dad" - 2:14
6. "Co-Song" - 1:43
7. "Closer To Grey" - 3:08
8. "Final Hours" - 3:35
9. "Muffled" - 3:05
10. "Broken Bubble" - 2:34
11. "Dying Duck In A Thunderstorm" - 3:19
12. "Think Of Tomorrow" - 2:22
13. "Pete's Farm" - 0:57

== Credits ==
=== Ten Foot Pole ===
- Scott Radinsky - vocals
- Steve Carnan - lead guitar
- Tony Palermo - drums
- Pete Newbury - bass
- Dennis Jagard - guitar

=== Additional Musicians ===
- Sally Browder - engineer
- John Baffa - additional percussion on "My Wall" and "Dying Duck In A Thunderstorm"

=== Producers ===
- Sally Browder
- Ten Foot Pole
