= Okubo algebra =

In algebra, an Okubo algebra or pseudo-octonion algebra is an 8-dimensional non-associative algebra similar to the one studied by Susumu Okubo. Okubo algebras are composition algebras, flexible algebras A(BA) = (AB)A, Lie admissible algebras, and power associative, but are not associative, not alternative algebras, and do not have an identity element.

Okubo's example was the algebra of 3-by-3 complex matrices with zero trace, with the product of X and Y given by aXY + bYX − Tr(XY)I/3, where I is the identity matrix and a and b satisfy a + b = 3ab = 1. The Hermitian elements form an 8-dimensional real non-associative division algebra. A similar construction works for any cubic alternative separable algebra over a field containing a primitive cube root of unity. An Okubo algebra is an algebra constructed in this way from the trace-zero elements of a degree-3 central simple algebra over a field.

== Construction of Para-Hurwitz algebra ==
Unital composition algebras are called Hurwitz algebras. If the ground field K is the field of real numbers and N is positive-definite, then A is called a Euclidean Hurwitz algebra.

=== Scalar product ===
If K has characteristic not equal to 2, then a bilinear form (a, b) = 1/2[N(a + b) − N(a) − N(b)] is associated with the quadratic form N.

=== Involution in Hurwitz algebras ===
Assuming A has a multiplicative unity, define involution and right and left multiplication operators by

a̅ = −a + 2(a,1)1, L(a)b = ab, R(a)b = ba

Evidently is an involution and preserves the quadratic form. The overline notation stresses the fact that complex and quaternion conjugation are partial cases of it. These operators have the following properties:

- The involution is an antiautomorphism, i.e. a̅ b̅ = b̅ a̅
- a a̅ = N(a) 1 = a̅ a
- L(a̅) = L(a)*, R(a̅) = R(a)*, where * denotes the adjoint operator with respect to the form ( , )
- Re(a b) = Re(b a) where Re x = (x + x̅)/2 = (x, 1)
- Re((a b) c) = Re(a (b c))
- L(a^{2}) = L(a)^{2}, R(a^{2}) = R(a)^{2}, so that A is an alternative algebra

These properties are proved starting from polarized version of the identity (a b, a b) = (a, a)(b, b):

2(a, b)(c, d) = (ac, bd) + (ad, bc).

- Setting b = 1 or d = 1 yields L(a̅) = L(a)* and R(c̅) = R(c)*.
- Hence Re(a b) = (a b, 1) = (a, b̅) = (b a, 1) = Re(b a).
- Similarly (a̅ b̅, c) = (a b, c̅) = (b, a̅ c̅) = (1, b̅ (a̅ c̅)) = (1, (b̅ a̅) c̅) = (b̅ a̅, c).
- Hence Re(a b)c = ((a b)c, 1) = (a b, c̅) = (a, c̅ b̅) = (a(b c), 1) = Re(a(b c)).
- By the polarized identity N(a) (c, d) = (ac, ad) = (a̅ a c, d) so L(a̅) L(a) = N(a).
- Applied to 1 this gives a̅ a = N(a).
- Replacing a by a̅ gives the other identity.
- Substituting the formula for a̅ in L(a̅) L(a) = L(a̅ a) gives L(a)^{2} = L(a^{2}).

=== Para-Hurwitz algebra ===
Another operation ∗ may be defined in a Hurwitz algebra as

x ∗ y = x̅ y̅

The algebra (A, ∗) is a composition algebra not generally unital, known as a para-Hurwitz algebra. In dimensions 4 and 8 these are para-quaternion and para-octonion algebras.

A para-Hurwitz algebra satisfies

(x * y) * x = x * (y * x) = ⟨x | x⟩ y.

Conversely, an algebra with a non-degenerate symmetric bilinear form satisfying this equation is either a para-Hurwitz algebra or an eight-dimensional pseudo-octonion algebra. Similarly, a flexible algebra satisfying

⟨xy | xy⟩ = ⟨x | x⟩ ⟨y | y⟩

is either a Hurwitz algebra, a para-Hurwitz algebra or an eight-dimensional pseudo-octonion algebra.
