= Third World Girl =

Third World Girl may refer to:

- Third World Girl, album by Avion Blackman (2011)
- "Third World Girl", tribute song to Bob Marley by Marvin Gaye from Midnight Love
- "Third World Girl", song by Ten Foot Pole from Swill (1993)
- Third World Girl: Selected Poems, by Jean "Binta" Breeze (2011)
