= Noncommutative Jordan algebra =

In algebra, a noncommutative Jordan algebra is an algebra, usually over a field of characteristic not 2, such that the four operations of left and right multiplication by x and x^{2} all commute with each other. Examples include associative algebras and Jordan algebras.

Over fields of characteristic not 2, noncommutative Jordan algebras are the same as flexible Jordan-admissible algebras, where a Jordan-admissible algebra – introduced by Albert (1948) and named after Pascual Jordan – is a (possibly non-associative) algebra that becomes a Jordan algebra under the product a ∘ b = ab + ba.

== See also ==
- Malcev-admissible algebra
- Lie-admissible algebra
