= Bad Mother Trucker =

Studio album by Ten Foot Pole
- Released: September 24, 2002
- Genre: Skate punk; pop-punk
- Length: 27:05
- Label: Victory
- Producer: Jim Monroe

Ten Foot Pole chronology
Insider (1998)	Bad Mother Trucker (2002)	Subliminable Messages (2004)

Bad Mother Trucker is an album by American punk rock band Ten Foot Pole.

The band re-recorded the album and released it in 2025 as Bad Mother Trucker (Taylor’s Version), a reference to Taylor Swift's re-recordings. (https://punkshits.com/ten-foot-pole-bad-mother-trucker-taylors-version/)

== Track listing ==
All songs written by Dennis Jagard, except "Happy Daze" and "Shelter" by Kevin Ruggeri

1. "Plastic" - 2:20
2. "Giving Gravity A Hand" - 2:33
3. "Do It Again" - 2:25
4. "Happy Daze" - 2:48
5. "Armchair Quarterback" - 2:16
6. "Nova Scotia" - 2:34
7. "Sarah Jones" - 2:30
8. "One Hero" - 2:15
9. "Shelter" - 2:14
10. "Wanna Be Alone" - 1:54
11. "Fall in Line" - 2:20
12. "Riptide" - 2:56

== Credits ==
- Kevin Ruggeri - Drums, Vox, (Lead Vox on "Shelter")
- John Chapman a.k.a. Johnny Smoke - Bass and Vox
- Steve Carnan a.k.a. Steve Von Treetrunk - Lead Guitar
- Dennis Jagard - Vox, Other Guitars.
- Jim Monroe - Producer
