= Isotype =

Isotype can refer to:

- Isotype (biology), a duplicate of the holotype of a species
- Isotype (crystallography), a synonym for isomorph
- Isotype (immunology), an antibody class according to its Fc region
- Isotype (picture language), a method of showing social, technological, biological and historical connections in pictorial form
- Isotype (song), 2017 song by Orchestral Manoeuvres in the Dark

== See also ==
- Isotope (disambiguation)
- Isoform
