= SO(8) =

Rotation group in 8-dimensional Euclidean space

D_{4}, Dynkin diagram of SO(8)

In mathematics, SO(8) is the special orthogonal group acting on eight-dimensional Euclidean space. It could be either a real or complex simple Lie group of rank 4 and dimension 28.

== Spin(8) ==
Like all special orthogonal groups SO(n) with n ≥ 2, SO(8) is not simply connected. And like all SO(n) with n > 2, the fundamental group of SO(8) is isomorphic to Z_{2}. The universal cover of SO(8) is the spin group Spin(8).

== Center ==
The center of SO(8) is Z_{2}, the diagonal matrices {±I} (as for all SO(2n) with 2n ≥ 4), while the center of Spin(8) is Z_{2}×Z_{2} (as for all Spin(4n), 4n ≥ 4).

== Triality ==
SO(8) is unique among the simple Lie groups in that its Dynkin diagram, (D_{4} under the Dynkin classification), possesses a three-fold symmetry. This gives rise to peculiar feature of Spin(8) known as triality. Related to this is the fact that the two spinor representations, as well as the fundamental vector representation, of Spin(8) are all eight-dimensional (for all other spin groups the spinor representation is either smaller or larger than the vector representation). The triality automorphism of Spin(8) lives in the outer automorphism group of Spin(8) which is isomorphic to the symmetric group S_{3} that permutes these three representations. The automorphism group acts on the center Z_{2} x Z_{2} (which also has automorphism group isomorphic to S_{3} which may also be considered as the general linear group over the finite field with two elements, S_{3} ≅GL(2,2)). When one quotients Spin(8) by one central Z_{2}, breaking this symmetry and obtaining SO(8), the remaining outer automorphism group is only Z_{2}. The triality symmetry acts again on the further quotient SO(8)/Z_{2}.

Sometimes Spin(8) appears naturally in an "enlarged" form, as the automorphism group of Spin(8), which breaks up as a semidirect product: Aut(Spin(8)) ≅ PSO (8) ⋊ S_{3}.

== Unit octonions ==
Elements of SO(8) can be described with unit octonions, analogously to how elements of SO(2) can be described with unit complex numbers and elements of SO(4) can be described with unit quaternions. However the relationship is more complicated, partly due to the non-associativity of the octonions. A general element in SO(8) can be described as the product of 7 left-multiplications, 7 right-multiplications and also 7 bimultiplications by unit octonions (a bimultiplication being the composition of a left-multiplication and a right-multiplication by the same octonion and is unambiguously defined due to octonions obeying the Moufang identities).

It can be shown that an element of SO(8) can be constructed with bimultiplications, by first showing that pairs of reflections through the origin in 8-dimensional space correspond to pairs of bimultiplications by unit octonions. The triality automorphism of Spin(8) described below provides similar constructions with left multiplications and right multiplications.

=== Octonions and triality ===
If $x,y,z\in\mathbb{O}$ and $(xy)z=1$, it can be shown that this is equivalent to $x(yz)=1$, meaning that $xyz=1$ without ambiguity. A triple of maps $(\alpha,\beta,\gamma)$ that preserve this identity, so that $x^\alpha y^\beta z^\gamma=1$ is called an isotopy. If the three maps of an isotopy are in $\operatorname{SO(8)}$, the isotopy is called an orthogonal isotopy. If $\gamma\in \operatorname{SO(8)}$, then following the above $\gamma$ can be described as the product of bimultiplications of unit octonions, say $\gamma=B_{u_1}...B_{u_n}$. Let $\alpha,\beta \in \operatorname{SO(8)}$ be the corresponding products of left and right multiplications by the conjugates (i.e., the multiplicative inverses) of the same unit octonions, so $\alpha=L_{\overline{u_1}}...L_{\overline{u_n}}$, $\beta=R_{\overline{u_1}}...R_{\overline{u_n}}$. A simple calculation shows that $(\alpha,\beta,\gamma)$ is an isotopy. As a result of the non-associativity of the octonions, the only other orthogonal isotopy for $\gamma$ is $(-\alpha,-\beta,\gamma)$. As the set of orthogonal isotopies produce a 2-to-1 cover of $\operatorname{SO}(8)$, they must in fact be $\operatorname{Spin}(8)$.

Multiplicative inverses of octonions are two-sided, which means that $xyz=1$ is equivalent to $yzx=1$. This means that a given isotopy $(\alpha,\beta,\gamma)$ can be permuted cyclically to give two further isotopies $(\beta,\gamma,\alpha)$ and $(\gamma,\alpha,\beta)$. This produces an order 3 outer automorphism of $\operatorname{Spin}(8)$. This "triality" automorphism is exceptional among spin groups. There is no triality automorphism of $\operatorname{SO}(8)$, as for a given $\gamma$ the corresponding maps $\alpha,\beta$ are only uniquely determined up to sign.

== Root system ==
$$(\pm 1,\pm 1,0,0)$$
$$(\pm 1,0,\pm 1,0)$$
$$(\pm 1,0,0,\pm 1)$$
$$(0,\pm 1,\pm 1,0)$$
$$(0,\pm 1,0,\pm 1)$$
$$(0,0,\pm 1,\pm 1)$$

== Weyl group ==
Its Weyl/Coxeter group has 4! × 8 = 192 elements.

== Cartan matrix ==
$$\begin{pmatrix}
2  & -1 & -1 & -1\\
-1 &  2 &  0 &  0\\
-1 &  0 &  2 &  0\\
-1 &  0 &  0 &  2
\end{pmatrix}$$

== See also ==
- Octonions
- Clifford algebra
- G_{2}
