= Simi Institute for Careers and Education =

Coordinates: 34.27049°N 118.73500°W

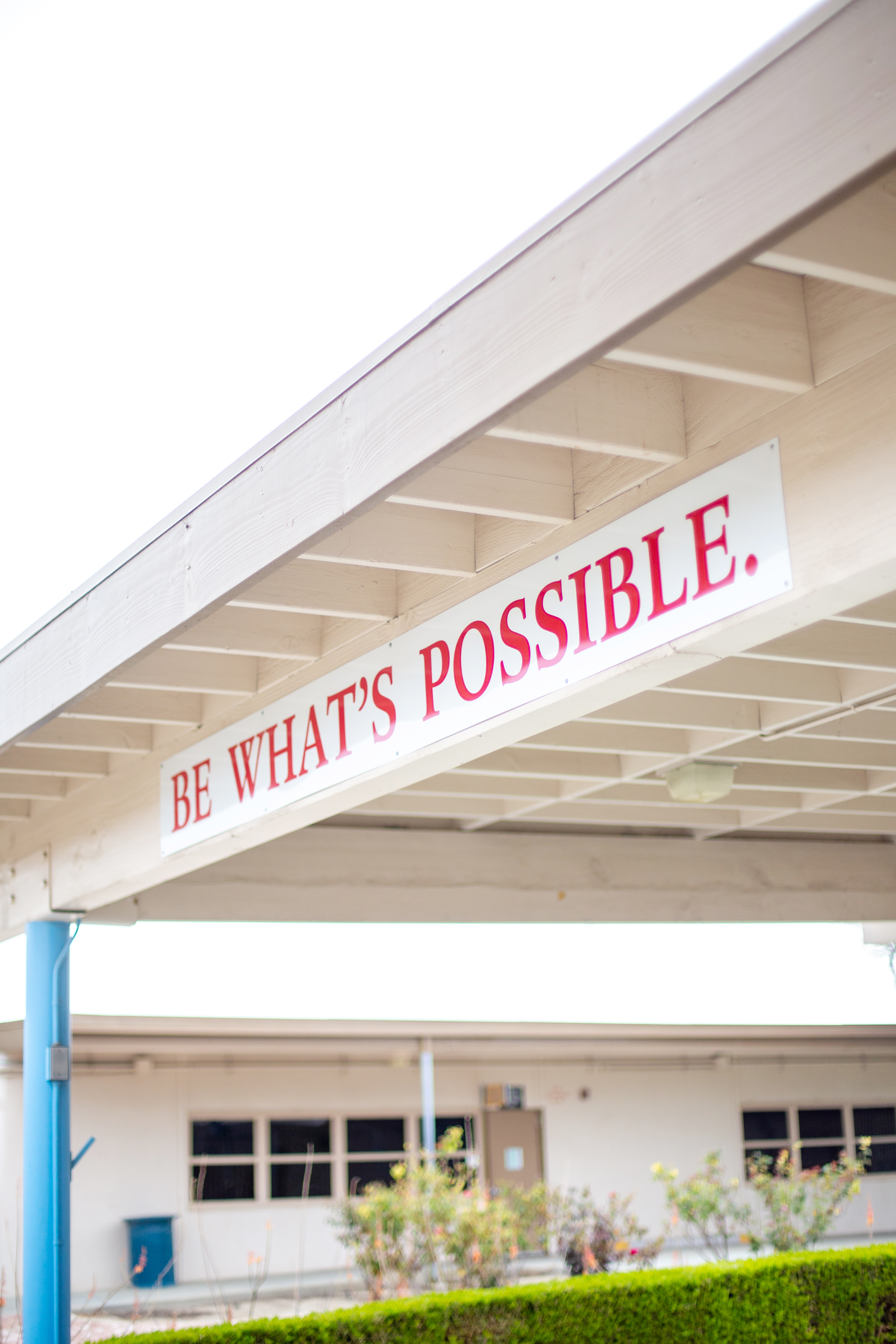

Location
- 1880 Blackstock Avenue; Simi Valley, California; United States

Information
- Former name: Simi Valley Adult School
- School type: Public Adult Education
- Motto: Be What's Possible.
- Established: 1936
- School district: Simi Valley Unified School District
- CEEB code: 53376
- Principal: Alan Penner
- Campus: Suburban
- Accreditation: Western Association of Schools and Colleges
- Website: http://www.simiinstitute.org

Simi Institute for Careers and Education, formerly known as Simi Valley Adult School, is the adult education division of the Simi Valley Unified School District located in eastern Ventura County, between Los Angeles and Santa Barbara Counties. School enrolments are reported to be more than 11,000 students a year with about half pursuing occupational training programs.

Simi Institute is accredited by the Western Association of Schools and Colleges.

== History ==
Established in 1936, Simi Institute for Careers and Education (SICE) was founded to extend learning to adults. Since then, it has flourished and expanded its educational services to meet the needs of the ever-changing Simi Valley community and surrounding areas. The adult school campus is located in the geographic center of Simi Valley near the corner of Los Angeles Avenue and Blackstock Avenue. Additional facilities are utilized for the cosmetology and dental programs, as well as other nearby medical sites which are used for instructional purposes.

Many adults find the flexible curriculum at the adult school suits their economical needs for education, providing help for many people to re-enter the work force with viable skills. Simi Institute offers a means to upgrade skills or learn new ones to change or re-enter the workforce.

== Programs ==
The school enjoys a placement rate ranging from 70% to 100% in its many areas of study. Students receive support from the counseling staff, teachers and administration, as well as an onsite Job & Career Center for help with resumes and job placement.

== Mission ==
Simi Institute for Careers & Education's mission is to educate students to meet their career and/or personal goals.
