= Simi Valley Unified School District =

School district in Ventura County, California

Address
- 101 West Cochran Street Simi Valley, California, 93065; United States

District information
- Type: Public
- Grades: K-12, adult education, preschool
- Superintendent: Dr. Hani Youssef
- Schools: 27
- Budget: $142 million (restricted and unrestricted)
- NCES District ID: 0636840

Students and staff
- Students: 15,899 (2022–2023)
- Teachers: 704.41 (FTE)
- Staff: 784.16 (FTE)
- Student–teacher ratio: 22.64:1

Other information
- Teachers' unions: Simi Educators Association, California Teachers Association
- Website: www.simivalleyusd.org

Simi Valley Unified School District (SVUSD) is a school district in Ventura County, California. The district serves students from the city of Simi Valley, the census-designated place of Santa Susana, and other adjacent unincorporated areas. SVUSD operates 18 elementary schools, three middle schools, four high schools (including two comprehensive schools, one magnet school, and one continuation school), one adult school, and one independent study school. During the 2014–15 school year, the district's enrollment numbered about 18,000. The current superintendent is Dr. Hani Youssef, who has served since July 2022.

== History ==
=== Ninth grade move to high schools, Santa Susana High opening ===
Throughout its early history, the Simi Valley Unified School District educated ninth graders at its junior high schools. This changed in the mid-1990s, when the school board approved a controversial plan to move ninth graders to its high schools. To offset the lower enrollment at the junior high schools, the district converted one of the then four junior high campuses into a magnet high school. Sequoia Junior High School reopened as Santa Susana High School in 1996.

=== Declining enrollment and school closures ===
Beginning in 1995, the Simi Valley Unified School District considered closing schools due to what was then early on-set declining enrollment. Simi Elementary School, in the 1990s, was already considered first for school closure due to high maintenance costs and its small size. Other schools considered at the time were Sycamore, Mountain View, and Justin elementary schools. Ultimately, the district voted to not close any school due to backlash from the community, as they had previously closed four schools prior in the 1980s.

Enrollment declines in Simi Valley and the state of California continued into the 2000s. Following a peak of 22,000 in 2003, the number of students in the district reduced to 18,000 in 2013. In response, a committee consisting of administrators, teachers, parents, and community members recommended closing three schools. On January 14, 2014, after hearing public testimony, the committee decided not to close any schools and disbanded.

On January 31, 2014, Simi Elementary School was notified of possible relocation of the school due to the overall condition and safety of the campus. The school was built in 1926 as the first in Simi Valley; Ventura County has named it a Historical Landmark. (Note: Simi Elementary School & Bungalows was designed by architect Arthur G. Lindley and was designated County Landmark # 139 in August 1990. The school was built in 1926 by Lutz Construction Company as a part of Community Center and has been in continuous use. The bungalows were built from lumber from the original Simi School (1890).) The issues at hand regarding the facility and infrastructure are:

- Broken water mains
- Possible broken sewer line under a classroom which has caused the floor to sink
- Gas lines underground which are old and brittle causing periodic gas leaks
- Deteriorating roofs
- A septic tank which is in danger of collapsing
- Potential asbestos
- Potential rust in water lines
- Potential mold
- Potential lead

The Inspection was contracted through LI & Associates, Inc. who has been monitoring the infrastructure and safety of the school since November 12, 2012. In the latest report dated January 7, 2014, the company, regarding the administrative building, stated, "During process of our seismic retrofit design on this building, we learned that this building does not have a valid DSA permit. (Note: Application # 114530 for alterations to the administrative building was approved by the Division of the State Architect (DSA) on February 12, 2013.) Therefore, this building cannot be used by student per California State regulations."

Due to the cost of needed repairs to the Simi Elementary campus, SVUSD decided to close Simi Elementary. On February 4, 2014, the board voted 4–1 to relocate Simi Elementary to the Mountain View Elementary campus as of February 18, 2014; the school continued to function as a separate school until the end of the 2013–14 school year.

In the fall of the 2014-15 school year, SVUSD made a recommendation to close Abraham Lincoln and Justin elementary schools due to a decline in enrollment and approved the closure in January 2015. Monte Vista School is using the Lincoln campus and Justin Early Learners Academy is using the Justin campus.

=== Random drug testing ===
The SVUSD board voted in 2014 to offer random drug testing of high school students whose parents or legal guardians voluntarily sign them up. In 2002, the U.S. Supreme Court upheld the constitutionality of mandatory drug testing by public schools of students participating in extracurricular activities.

== Schools ==
=== Elementary schools ===
- Arroyo Elementary School
- Atherwood Elementary School
- Berylwood Elementary School
- Crestview Elementary School
- Big Springs Elementary School
- Garden Grove Elementary School
- Hollow Hills Fundamental School
- Katherine Elementary School
- Knolls Elementary School
- Madera Elementary School
- Mountain View Elementary School
- Park View Elementary School
- Santa Susana Elementary School
- Sycamore Elementary School
- Township Elementary School
- Vista Fundamental School
- White Oak Elementary School
- Wood Ranch Elementary School

==== Former elementary schools ====
- Abraham Lincoln Elementary School (1959–2015)
- Simi Elementary School (1927–2015)
- Walnut Grove Elementary School (1963-1983)
- Justin Elementary School
- Belwood Elementary School
- Arcane Elementary School

=== Middle schools ===
- Hillside Middle School
- Sinaloa Middle School
- Valley View Middle School

==== Former middle schools ====
- Sequoia Junior High School (1970–1996, now Santa Susana High School)

=== High schools ===
- Royal High School
- Santa Susana High School
- Simi Valley High School

=== Adult schools ===
- Simi Institute for Careers and Education

=== Alternative/independent schools ===
- Apollo Continuation School
- Monte Vista School (K—12 Independent Study-Homeschool)
- Justin Early Learners Academy (Preschool)
