= Beau Sandland =

American football player (born 1993)

No. 85
- Position: Tight end

Personal information
- Born: February 23, 1993 (age 33); Simi Valley, California, U.S.
- Listed height: 6 ft 5 in (1.96 m)
- Listed weight: 255 lb (116 kg)

Career information
- High school: Simi Valley (CA)
- College: Montana State
- NFL draft: 2016: 7th round, 252nd overall pick

Career history
- Carolina Panthers (2016)*; Green Bay Packers (2016–2017)*; Arizona Cardinals (2018)*
- * Offseason or practice squad member only
- Stats at Pro Football Reference

Beau Sandland (born February 23, 1993) is an American former football tight end. He played college football at Montana State.

== Professional career ==
Pre-draft measurables
Height	Weight	Arm length	Hand span	40-yard dash	10-yard split	20-yard split	20-yard shuttle	Three-cone drill	Vertical jump	Broad jump	Bench press
6 ft 4 in (1.93 m)	253 lb (115 kg)	34 1/4 in (0.87 m)	10 1/8 in (0.26 m)	4.74 s	1.67 s	2.76 s	4.33 s	7.10 s	35 in (0.89 m)	10 ft 4 in (3.15 m)	23 reps
All values from 2016 NFL Scouting Combine.

=== Carolina Panthers ===
Sandland was drafted by the Carolina Panthers in the seventh round, 252nd overall, of the 2016 NFL draft. On September 3, 2016, he was waived by the Panthers as a part of final roster cuts. The next day, Sandland was re-signed to the Panthers' practice squad. He was released by the Panthers on November 9.

=== Green Bay Packers ===
On November 11, 2016, Sandland was signed to the Green Bay Packers' practice squad. He signed a futures contract with the Packers on January 24, 2017. Sandland was placed on injured reserve on August 13. On August 18, he was released from injured reserve.

=== Arizona Cardinals ===
On April 16, 2018, Sandland signed with the Arizona Cardinals. He was waived by the Cardinals on July 20, with a non-football injury designation.
