= Malcev-admissible algebra =

In algebra, a Malcev-admissible algebra, introduced by Myung (1983), is a (possibly non-associative) algebra that becomes a Malcev algebra under the bracket [a, b] = ab − ba. Examples include alternative algebras, Malcev algebras and Lie-admissible algebras.

== See also ==
- Jordan-admissible algebra
