= Cheshire 14 =

Sailboat class

Development
- Designer: Frank Meldau
- Location: United States
- Year: 1962
- No. built: 500 (1994)
- Builder: Fiberglass Unlimited/Custom Fiberglass International
- Name: Cheshire 14

Boat
- Displacement: 185 lb (84 kg)
- Draft: 2.08 ft (0.63 m) with the centerboards down

Hull
- Type: Catamaran
- Construction: Fiberglass
- LOA: 14.00 ft (4.27 m)
- Beam: 6.42 ft (1.96 m)

Hull appendages
- Keel: dual centerboards
- Rudder: transom-mounted rudders

Rig
- Rig type: Bermuda rig

Sails
- Sailplan: Fractional rigged sloop
- Mainsail area: 105 sq ft (9.8 m^{2})
- Jib/genoa area: 30 sq ft (2.8 m^{2})
- Total sail area: 135 sq ft (12.5 m^{2})

Racing
- D-PN: 80.0

The Cheshire 14 is an American catamaran sailing dinghy that was designed by Frank Meldau as a racer and first built in 1962.

The design is the smaller stablemate of the Isotope catamaran.

== Production ==
The design is built by Fiberglass Unlimited, now called Custom Fiberglass International, in Wake Forest, North Carolina, United States and remains in production. By 1994 it was reported that 500 boats had been built.

== Design ==
The Cheshire 14 is a recreational sailboat, with the hulls built predominantly of fiberglass with internal tubular frames. The hulls are connected by three tubular aluminum cross-members, which also support the mainsheet traveler, the mast and the forestay respectively. The boat has a fractional sloop rig with a rotating mast and anodized aluminum spars. The hulls have spooned raked stems, vertical transoms, dual transom-hung rudders controlled by a tiller and dual retractable centerboards. the boat displaces 185 lb (84 kg).

The boat has a draft of 2.08 ft (0.63 m) with the centerboards extended and 0.42 ft (0.13 m) with them retracted, allowing beaching or ground transportation on a trailer.

For sailing the design is equipped with a righting bar, roller furling jib, sail battens made of ash wood and positive flotation. Optional equipment includes a trapeze and fiberglass battens.

The design has a Portsmouth Yardstick racing average handicap of 80.0. The boat can accommodate three adults, but is normally raced by one sailor.

== Operational history ==
In a 1994 review Richard Sherwood wrote, "the Cheshire catamaran predates the Hobie and has been in production for almost 20 years. The pivoting centerboards are unique to the Cheshire and its sister, the Isotope. The boards are easier to retract than daggerboards."

== See also ==
- List of sailing boat types

Related designs

- Isotope (catamaran)
