= Subliminable Messages =

Studio album by Ten Foot Pole
- Released: June 8, 2004
- Genre: Skate punk; melodic hardcore
- Length: 29:56
- Label: Go-Kart

Ten Foot Pole chronology
Bad Mother Trucker (2002)	Subliminable Messages (2004)

Subliminable Messages is the sixth album by American punk rock band Ten Foot Pole. The title refers to a Bushism.

== Track listing ==
1. "Wake Up (And Smell the Fascism)" - 2:42
2. "Kicked Out of Kindergarten" - 2:48
3. "She Looks Like" - 1:52
4. "Rachel Corrie" - 2:57
5. "Black and Blue" - 2:52
6. "Last Call for Russell's Balls" - 2:52
7. "With You by My Side" - 2:27
8. "Still Believe" - 2:09
9. "Your World" - 2:48
10. "Heaven and Hell" - 2:44
11. "The Quest" - 2:33
12. "Toss It All" - 3:22

== Credits ==
- Dennis Jagard: vocals and guitar
- Kevin Ruggeri: drums and vocals
- Mike Levy: bass and vocals
- Eric Cody: lead guitar
