= Together Again for the First Time =

Together Again For The First Time

Studio album by Pulley
- Released: October 9, 2001
- Recorded: 2001
- Genre: Punk rock
- Length: 29:56
- Label: Epitaph
- Producer: Ryan Greene

Pulley chronology
@#!* (1999)	Together Again For The First Time (2001)	Matters (2004)

Professional ratings
Review scores
Source	Rating
AllMusic	4.5/5 stars

Together Again for the First Time is a 2001 album by the punk rock band Pulley. It was the band's first album to be released after Scott Radinsky's pitching career ended.

== Track listing ==
1. "In Search" – 2:11
2. "Hooray For Me" – 2:18
3. "History Repeats Itself" – 2:28
4. "Fuel" – 2:12
5. "Empty" – 2:42
6. "Lost Trip" – 2:29
7. "Touched" – 2:57
8. "Runaway" – 2:50
9. "The Ocean Song" – 2:56
10. "Destiny" – 0:19
11. "Leather Face" – 1:40
12. "Same Sick Feeling" – 2:01
13. "Silenced" – 2:51
