= Isotopic =

Isotopic may refer to:

- In the physical sciences, to do with chemical isotopes
- In mathematics, to do with a relation called isotopy; see Isotopy (disambiguation)
- In geometry, isotopic refers to facet-transitivity
