= Lie-admissible algebra =

In algebra, a Lie-admissible algebra, introduced by A. Adrian Albert (1948), is a (possibly non-associative) algebra that becomes a Lie algebra under the bracket [a, b] = ab − ba. Examples include associative algebras, Lie algebras, and Okubo algebras.

== See also ==
- Malcev-admissible algebra
- Jordan-admissible algebra
