= Apollo High School (Simi Valley, California) =

Location
- 3150 School Street; Simi Valley, California; United States
- Coordinates: 34°16′12″N 118°44′10″W

Information
- Type: Public Continuation
- Established: 1957
- School district: Simi Valley Unified School District
- CEEB code: 53377
- Principal: Dean May
- Teaching staff: 11.51 (FTE)
- Grades: 9-12
- Enrollment: 110 (2023-2024)
- Student to teacher ratio: 9.56
- Campus: Suburban
- Website: https://ahs-simi-ca.schoolloop.com/

Apollo High School is a High School located in Simi Valley, California, United States. Its goals are to provide "a safe, caring, and academically challenging environment in which students can grow academically and personally".
