= The Long and the Short of It =

Australian country music duo

Patsy and Dave formerly The Long and the Short of It
- Origin: Melbourne, Victoria Australia
- Genres: Country
- Years active: 2007–present
- Labels: Ambition Entertainment
- Members: David Baird; Patsy Toop

Patsy and Dave formerly known as The Long and Short of It are an Australian duo consisting of David Baird and Patsy Toop (OAM), who met in 2007 and released their first music in 2009.

The duo have released seven albums, two EPs, and have won awards including a Tamworth Songwriters Award (2011), a Tasmanian Independent Country Music Award for Most Popular Duo (2016), an Indie Country Music Australia (ICMA) Award for Most Popular Independent Country Duo (2017, 2019 and 2021), a Southern Star Awards Award for Best Duo or Band (2016) and a Gold Media Medallion Award for Best Duo Nationally (2015, 2018 & 2023). Their most recent album “The Willow”released on September 6th 2024 and achieved a number 1 on ARIA Country Music Albums. The album has scored two co-writes with legendary Russell Morris who features on two songs, “The Willow” and “Rumblin’ Train”.

== Discography ==
=== Albums ===
List of albums, with selected details and chart positions
Title	Album details	Peak chart positions
Title	Album details	AUS
Standing at the Station	Released: June 2012; Format: CD, Digital; Label: The Long and the Short of It	—
You Made Me Stronger	Released: 2014; Format: CD, Digital; Label: The Long and the Short of It	—
The Night of Our Lives	Released: October 2016; Format: CD, Digital; Label: The Long and the Short of It, Checked Label	—
Requested Favourites	Released: 2017; Format: CD, Digital; Label: The Long and the Short of It, Checked Label	—
Midnight Choir	Released: 5 August 2022; Format: CD, Digital; Label: Ambition Entertainment (AMBITION157)	37

=== EPs ===
List of EPs, with selected details
Title	Details
My Forever Book	Released: June 2013; Format: Digital; Label: The Long and the Short of It
Somewhere in Between	Released: 2019; Format: Digital; Label: The Long and the Short of It
