= Matters (album) =

Studio album by Pulley
- Released: April 6, 2004
- Recorded: 2004
- Genre: Punk rock; skate punk; melodic hardcore; pop-punk
- Length: 33:35
- Label: Epitaph
- Producer: Matt Hyde

Pulley chronology
Together Again for the First Time (2001)	Matters (2004)	Time-Insensitive Material (2009)

Professional ratings
Review scores
Source	Rating
AllMusic	4/5 stars
Alternative Press	5/5 stars
Drowned in Sound	7/10

Matters is an album by the punk rock band Pulley. It was released on April 6, 2004, via Epitaph Records.

== Track listing ==
1. "A Bad Reputation" – 2:54
2. "Blindfold" – 2:43
3. "Huber Breeze" – 2:25
4. "Insects Destroy" – 3:20
5. "Looking Back" – 2:48
6. "Poltergeist" – 2:16
7. "Immune" – 4:24
8. "YSC" – 3:09
9. "Stomach Aches" – 2:51
10. "I Remember" – 2:20
11. "Suitcase" – 3:13
12. "Thanks" – 1:12
- Track 7 is two songs. "Immune" ends at 3:24. At the 3:26 mark begins a cover of the theme song to the 1970s children's television show Land of the Lost.
- In Track 8 the sound clip at 2:12-2:32 is from the song "The Master's Call," by Marty Robbins
