= Santa Susana High School =

Location
- 3570 Cochran Street; Simi Valley, California; United States; 34.27802°N 118.72687°W

Information
- Type: Public
- Established: September 5, 1996
- School district: Simi Valley Unified School District
- CEEB code: 053372
- NCES School ID: 063684006815
- Principal: Aimee Spurbeck-Boian
- Teaching staff: 46.20 (FTE)
- Grades: 9-12
- Enrollment: 1,002 (2023-2024)
- Student to teacher ratio: 21.69
- Campus: Suburban
- Colors: Silver, black, white, and teal
- Mascot: The Troubadour
- Website: Official website

Santa Susana High School is a public high school located in Simi Valley, California, United States. It is part of the Simi Valley Unified School District and serves grades 9 through 12. The school’s CEEB code is 053372, and as of the 2023–2024 school year, 1,002 students were enrolled, with a student-to-teacher ratio of 7:23. The current principal is Aimee Spurbeck-Boian. The school colors are silver, black, white, and teal, and its mascot is the Troubadour.

Currently, Santa Susana High School is configured with three classroom blocks, surrounding a quad. A large open-air amphitheater divides the classroom complex, the school's MUR, music, stagecraft, film and broadcasting workshops, and Black Box Theater. The 422-seat Performing Arts Center, dance studios, and the student parking lot are located west of the multipurpose room.

== School structure ==
Santa Susana's school structure is the "school-within-a-school" model, which allows students to pursue their academic interests as they build skills for a post-secondary life. Programs are organized into three smaller schools: the School of Academics, School of Technical Arts, and School of Visual & Performing Arts. Students receive priority for enrollment in their selected course of study ranging from: accelerated academics (Humanities, Math, Science), legal practices, STEM: Robotics & Engineering; Technical Arts including graphics & publication, movie and film production, broadcast journalism, stagecraft, & website design; Visual & Performing Arts including fine arts, vocal & instrumental music, theater & musical theater, and dance. The World Languages course of study integrates the Career Education standards in Hospitality, Tourism, and Recreation and is conducted in French, German, or Spanish. Two new courses of study were offered for 2016–2017 including Audio Recording and Commercial Illustration.

=== Advanced academics ===
In 2015, SSHS scored 86% proficient and above on the CAASPP ELA and 55% in Mathematics.

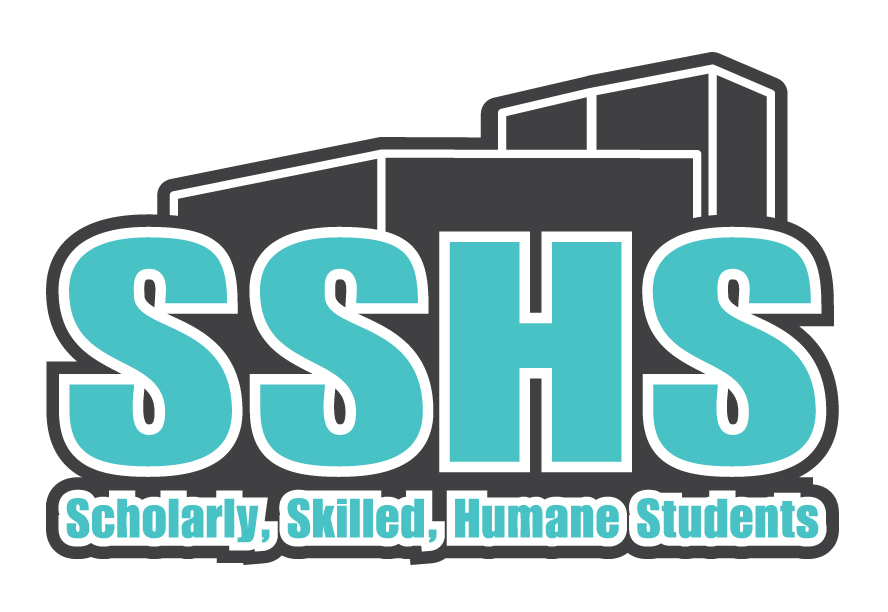
Secondary Santa Susana High School Logo used since 2013.

The Law Academy is part of the School of Academics. In 2007, Santa Susana received a large California Department of Education Specialized Secondary Programs Grant, to create the Academy of Law & Society. Students in this academy complete courses such as Ethics & Logic, Law and Order, and Applied Legal Studies. The Mock Trial team won 1st place in 2014 San Francisco's Empire Competition and 4th place overall in 2015 New York's World Competition. Students in this program are mentored by several attorney coaches, college Mock Trial team members, and an Artist in Residence.

The STEM: Focus on Robotics & Engineering emphasis started in 2013–2014. In the first two years of inception, STEM received over $70,000 in funding to build courses such as Exploring Computer Science and Robotics, provide STEM training to teachers across the curriculum, and purchase supplies for students such as robotics equipment and 3D printers. Student activities within this program include an active and competitive Robotics Club and STEM Science Fair.

The Distinguished Speaker series has featured guests such as Holocaust Survivor Ben Lesser, Curiosity Rover engineer Melissa Soriano, Congressional Medal of Honor Recipient Sergeant Gary Littrell, Skeptic Magazine Editor Michael Shermer, and Former Mexican President Vicente Fox.

=== Visual and performing arts ===
Santa Susana has Visual and Performing Arts Programs. Santa Susana High School received funding from a city bond and state funds to construct a Performing Arts Theater Center. First approved by voters in 2004 as part of the Simi Valley Unified School District's C4 Bond measure, HMC Architects initially delivered plans for a multipurpose room for which $8.6 million was allocated. The multipurpose room became an auditorium, and eventually became the 12,730-square-foot (1,183 m^{2}) Performing Arts Center unveiled in April 2011.

== Career and technical education ==
Santa Susana High School offers a number of Career and Technical Education (CTE) classes, including web design, graphic design, broadcasting, stagecraft, and video production. The newest CTE programs include Hospitality, Tourism & Recreation and Performing Arts. Students receive an articulated curriculum and work-based learning experiences such as guest speakers, trips to job sites, and mentor & internships. They also develop an online portfolio to be used when looking for work and applying to colleges.

=== Web design ===
Students learn how to code dynamic websites with a variety of programming and markup languages. Students work on projects that range from coding rock-paper-scissors in JavaScript and PHP with a database, to redoing local restaurant or business sites, to creating and maintaining the school's website.

=== Stagecraft ===
The Stagecraft Technology class is a member of the Career Education Center administered by the Ventura County Superintendent of Schools and taught by professionals who continue to work in the entertainment industry. Over the course of the school year students gain hands-on experience in all facets of backstage production. Each student is afforded a chance to focus in on his or her area of interest, with an eye toward eventual placement in a professional internship and job.

=== Broadcasting ===
The Broadcasting class consists of two components, journalism and production (often referred to as "tech.") Each week broadcasting writes scripts, researches stories, produces and publishes a weekly KSSH News Show.

=== Video production ===
The goal of CTE Video Production is to prepare students for entry-level positions in the film industry. Students learn how to edit films using Final Cut Pro on Macs in a video development room. Students develop story writing, videography, sound and editing techniques.

== Awards and achievements ==
In 2007 and 2011 Santa Susana High School received the Golden Bell Award from the California School Board Association for Invigorating High School Programs for the manner in which courses of study, certification, and senior project work together. On May 23, 2015, SSHS received the California Gold Ribbon School Award for this process which integrates Common Core and Career Education - preparing students for college and career. With an API (Academic Performance Index) score of 871, and Santa Susana High School Academy Structure it remains as one of the higher ranking schools in the area. Santa Susana High School is also serving as a CTE-AME Demonstration Site for the State of California from 2014–2016.

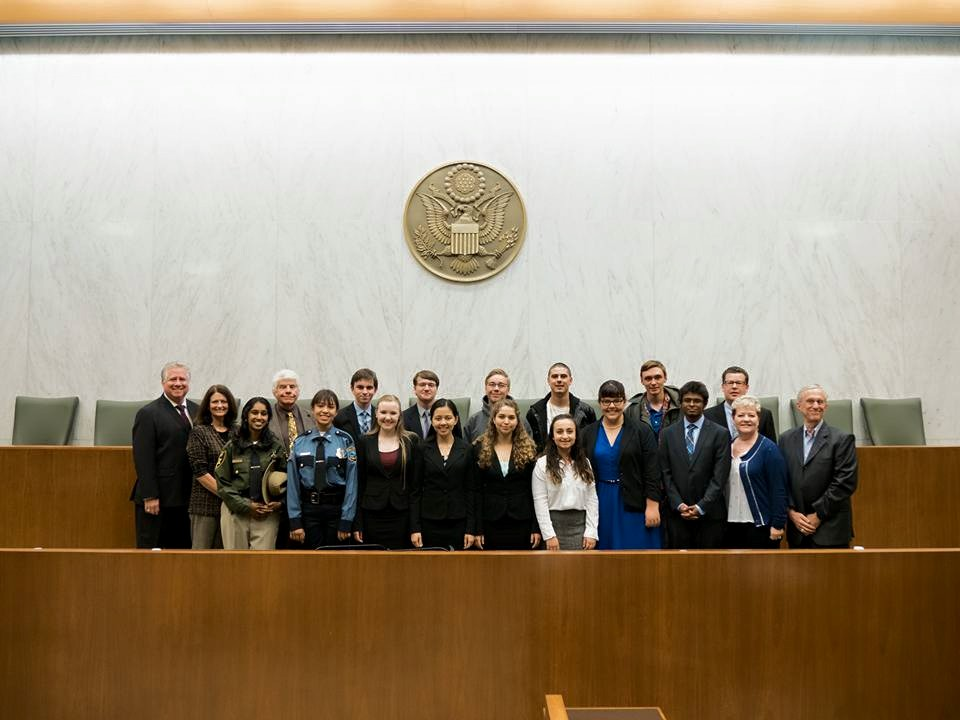
The Troubadour Team at the 2015 World Empire Competition in New York.

=== Mock trial ===
Santa Susana High School's mock trial team has been the #1 public high school team in Ventura County over multiple years. The Troubadour Team placed second in the county in 2014 and first in the International Empire Competition (San Francisco). They placed 4th in the World Empire Competition (New York) in 2015, as well as in the Empire “Battle by the Bay” International Competition in Fall 2018. Students in this program work with five volunteer attorney coaches and alumni/college Mock Trial students. The Santa Susana Varsity team was awarded 3rd place overall at the 2021 Ventura County competition (CRF). In 2019, SSHS headed to New York in October to compete in the Empire World Championship.

=== KROQ Punk Rock Prom with Blink-182 ===
In 2000, Los Angeles-based radio station KROQ held a contest open to all high schools in the broadcast area, requiring each school to successfully complete several Blink-182 and KROQ themed challenges in order to win a KROQ Punk Rock Prom with Blink-182. Santa Susana won. The Punk Rock Prom was held on May 23, 2000 inside the Moorpark Community College gymnasium. The whole student body was allowed to attend. KROQ outfitted the event with beach decor, snacks, Stryker as DJ, and a 2-hour long set by Blink-182.

=== Battle for Milquarious ===
Santa Susana High School won the grand prize of $20,000 in the Got Milk? “Battle for Milquarious, White Gold Milkdonkulous Giveaway.” The contest was designed to encourage teens to get creative with their video-making skills for a chance to win thousands of dollars for their public high schools’ art programs.

=== USCC ===
In 2011, four students competed in a worldwide Cyber security competition from the United States Cyber Challenge sponsored by several US government agencies. Santa Susana as a whole scored fourth place in California and 14th place nationally. The top student scored 23rd overall, first in Ventura County, CA, and fourth in California.

=== Nancy Reagan's funeral ===
In March 2016, two of Santa Susana High School's choirs were selected to perform at the funeral of former First Lady of the United States Nancy Reagan. The funeral took place at the Ronald Reagan Presidential Library in Simi Valley. Advanced Women's Choir and Abbe Road A Capella sang songs such as Somewhere Over the Rainbow and Battle Hymn of the Republic. The event was broadcast on television nationally and internationally.
