= Isotope (catamaran) =

Sailboat class

- Class symbol

Development
- Designer: Frank Meldau
- Location: United States
- Year: 1962
- No. built: 710
- Builder: Fiberglass Unlimited
- Role: One-design racer
- Name: Isotope

Boat
- Crew: one
- Displacement: 275 lb (125 kg)
- Draft: 2.50 ft (0.76 m) with the centerboards down

Hull
- Type: Catamaran
- Construction: Fiberglass
- LOA: 16.00 ft (4.88 m)
- Beam: 7.50 ft (2.29 m)

Hull appendages
- Keel: twin centerboards
- Rudder: transom-mounted rudders

Rig
- Rig type: Bermuda rig

Sails
- Sailplan: Fractional rigged sloop
- Mainsail area: 140 sq ft (13 m^{2})
- Jib/genoa area: 45 sq ft (4.2 m^{2})
- Total sail area: 185 sq ft (17.2 m^{2})

Racing
- D-PN: 74.0

The Isotope is an American catamaran sailing dinghy that was designed by Frank Meldau as a one-design racer and first built in 1962.

The design is the larger stablemate of the Cheshire 14 catamaran.

== Production ==
The design is built by Fiberglass Unlimited (now called Custom Fiberglass International) in Wake Forest, North Carolina, United States. A total of 710 have been built, and the design remains in production.

== Design ==
The Isotope is a recreational sailboat, built predominantly of fiberglass. It has a fractional sloop rig, with aluminum spars, a sealed rotating mast and fully battened mainsail, with eight ash wood or fiberglass battens. The hulls have spooned raked stems, vertical transoms, transom-hung, kick-up rudders controlled by a tiller and retractable, self-tending centerboards. The hulls are joined with three cross-members. There are two stowage compartments, with hatches. The boat displaces 275 lb (125 kg) and has flotation for positive buoyancy, plus a righting bar.

The boat has a draft of 2.50 ft (0.76 m) with the centerboards extended and 6 in (15 cm) with them retracted, allowing beaching or ground transportation on a trailer.

For sailing the design may be equipped with options such as a mast limiter, roller furling jib and a trapeze.

The design has a Portsmouth Yardstick racing average handicap of 74.0. It is normally raced with a crew of one sailor although it can carry three people.

== Operational history ==
In a 1994 review Richard Sherwood wrote, "sister to the Cheshire, the Isotope is two feet longer and five Portsmouth numbers faster."

== See also ==
- List of sailing boat types
- List of multihulls

Related development

- Cheshire 14
