= Isotopes Punk Rock Baseball Club =

- Origin: Vancouver, British Columbia
- Genres: Punk Rock; Pop-Punk; Baseball punk
- Years active: 2007–present
- Labels: Stomp Records; Red Scare Industries; 643 Records; Destiny Records
- Members: Evan October; Dallas Duststorm; Vlad Zak; Trevor Uppercutz; Rad Jockstrap; Justin Safely; Tony Hustle; Rookie Rochelle; Andy A-Bomb; Dylan Dangerzone; Mikey Batcracks
- Past members: Dan Undahand; JR Highlife; Juice Jeske; Satchel Rage; Viktor Spoils; Cutter Sharpe; Danny Diamond; Hockchaw Pelling; Marissa Pines; Al Wildcard; Ricky Sensation; Dylan Dinger; Ricky Rosinbagger; Jesse Jockitch; Mike Strikes; Ryan Express; Ricky Rochelle
- Website: www.isotopespunkrockbaseballclub.com

Isotopes Punk Rock Baseball Club or commonly, The Isotopes, are a Canadian punk rock band, based in Vancouver. All of the band's songs pertain to the subject of baseball or baseball-related topics. They've released a few 7-inch EPs through Red Scare Records and have self-professed themselves The "World's Greatest Baseball Punk Band". In January 2015, the band announced signing to Stomp Records and release of their debut album "Nuclear Strikezone". On April 14, 2017, the band is set to release their 2nd studio album "1994 World Series Champion" via Stomp/Destiny Records in North America and UK/Europe respectively.

In 2018, they were featured in the music documentary Baseball Punx.

== Discography ==
=== Studio albums ===
- Nuclear Strikezone (2015)
- 1994 World Series Champions (2017)

=== Extended plays ===
- Heatseeker (2009)
- Cuban Missile (2011)
- Blood Diamond (2012)

=== Singles ===
- "Lead Off" (2007)
- "The Ballad of Rey Ordonez" (2011)
- Total Juicehead (2015)
- The Invisible Hand Of The M.L.B. Is Meddling (2020)

=== Compilations ===
- "The First Four Seasons" (2013)
