= Swill (album) =

Studio album by Ten Foot Pole
- Released: October 19, 1993
- Recorded: 1993
- Genre: Hardcore punk; melodic hardcore; skate punk
- Length: 30:23
- Label: Ten Foot Records
- Producer: Ten Foot Pole

Ten Foot Pole chronology
Swill (1993)	Rev (1994)

Professional ratings
Review scores
Source	Rating
AllMusic	1.5/5 stars

Swill is an album by the American punk rock band Ten Foot Pole. The band's first album, it was originally released under their former name, Scared Straight until later copies of the album changed it to Ten Foot Pole. The band released the album on their own label. Joey Cape from Lagwagon makes a special guest appearance on the last track, which is a cover of “Joy To The World”. The tracks “Life” and School” are re-recorded and expanded versions of songs that appeared on previous Scared Straight and compilation releases on Mystic Records.

== Critical reception ==
AllMusic wrote that the album "is flatly produced and lacks immediately memorable material, but is refreshingly devoid of mainstream pretensions, especially for a band of their time and place (southern California, 1993)."

== Track listing ==
1. "People Like You" - 2:06
2. "Skywalker" - 2:17
3. "Pete's Shoes" - 2:32
4. "Life" - 3:25
5. "Home" - 2:43
6. "Ultimatum" - 3:04
7. "Forward" - 1:39
8. "Third World Girl" - 3:36
9. "Pete's Underwear" - 1:32
10. "School" - 1:55
11. "Man In The Corner" - 2:26
12. "Racer X" - 2:43
13. "Joy To The World" (Hoyt Axton cover) - 3:05

== Credits ==
- Dennis Jagard - guitar, producer
- Scott Radinsky - vocals, producer
- Pete Newbury - bass, producer
- Steve Von Treetrunk - guitar, producer
- Jordan Burns - drums, producer

=== Additional credit ===
- Joey Cape - vocals for "Joy To The World" (Hoyt Axton cover)
