= Ten Foot Pole =

American punk rock band

- Also known as: Scared Straight (1983–1993)
- Origin: Simi Valley, California, U.S.
- Genres: Punk rock; skate punk; pop-punk
- Years active: 1983–2006; 2009–present
- Labels: Go-Kart; Victory; Epitaph; Cybertracks; People of Punk Rock Records
- Members: Dennis Jagard; Richie Petrillo; Scott Hallquist; Guillaume Fortin
- Past members: Scott Radinsky; Steve Carnan; John Chapman; Kevin Ruggeri; Mike Levy; Eric Cody; Jordan Burns; Pat Magrath; Pete Newbury; Tony Palermo; Leigh Lawson; David Ames; Chris Dalley; Glen Vegas; Chris Del Rio; Keith Divel; Brian Walsby; Morgan Anderson; James Harris
- Website: tenfootpole.com

Ten Foot Pole (formerly Scared Straight) is an American punk rock band.

== History ==
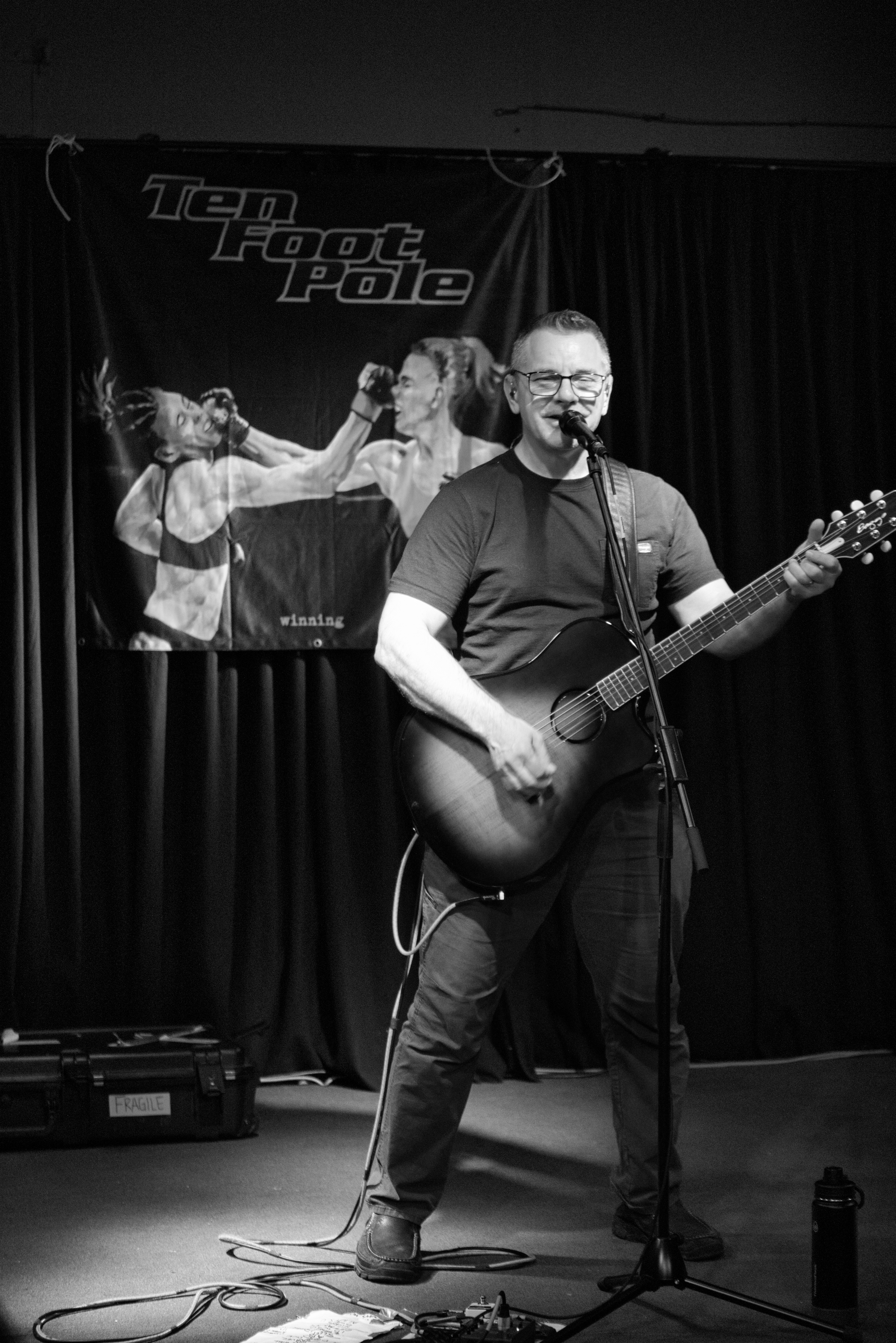
Dennis Jagard performing a solo acoustic concert at Club W71 in Weikersheim, 2025

Ten Foot Pole was founded in 1983 under the name Scared Straight.

Scared Straight was a punk band from Simi Valley, California. The band was formed in 1983 by a group of friends and was originally called S.O.F. Original members were Scott Radinsky, Mike Thompson, Gary Gallanes, and Dennis Jagard, who started the band to enter a "Battle of the Bands" competition at a local skate rink. After going through several members and name changes, they began playing with some "Nardcore" bands from nearby Oxnard, California, which helped them gain recognition. All of the Scared Straight records were released by Mystic Records.

When asked in a 1984 interview whether Scared Straight members were all straight edge, then bassist Morgan Anderson explained:

Scott [Radinsky], Steve [Carnan], and Dennis [Jagard] are. Me and James [Harris] aren't really. I mean we drink a little every now and then, but we don't do heavy drugs or anything.

In the early 1990s, after releasing You Drink, You Drive, You Die (1988), Scared Straight changed their name to Ten Foot Pole. One of the reasons for the name change was to move away from the "straight-edge" reputation that followed the band with a name like Scared Straight. In the beginning, Ten Foot Pole had a reputation of being a more aggressive, hardcore punk band that likes to party and have fun. The band released two albums under their new name with the old lineup: Swill and Rev. After the release of Rev and a split EP with Sweden's Satanic Surfers, Radinsky was forced to leave the band due to his professional baseball commitments and Ten Foot Pole's desire to be a full-time touring band. From then on Dennis Jagard took over lead vocals for the band.

The next albums, Unleashed and Insider, developed a new fan base but lost some old time fans who preferred Scott's voice. This included decision makers at Epitaph Records, and the next album, Bad Mother Trucker, was released on Victory Records, followed by Subliminable Messages on Go-Kart Records. The band toured Europe to promote the album, along with Phinius Gage. Various musicians joined and left along the way as the band toured heavily in the US and Canada. Various members include/included: Pat Magrath, Chris Del Rio, Scott Hallquist, Keith Divel, Glen "Vegas" Murray, Eric Cody, Kris Kwiatkowski, John Chapman, Dan Kelly, Chris Dalley, and Mike Levy who is a middle school teacher in Culver City, California, along with Kevin Ruggeri, who is an English teacher for Conestoga High School in Berwyn, Pennsylvania. Lead singer Dennis is a sound engineer, who has mixed for artists including Prince, Beck, AFI, and Jimmy Eat World.

On 4 April 2009, the band ended a three-year hiatus with a show at the Riorock festival in Belgium, followed by some shows in California in late 2011 and a short tour in Australia in November 2012. Ten Foot Pole played at Amnesia Rockfest in Montebello, QC, Canada in June 2015.

They were also featured 2000 in the Punk Goes Metal compilation performing a cover of "Love Song" by Tesla.

After over a decade of no studio material, Ten Foot Pole released the album Setlist in 2017 which mostly comprises re-recordings of past songs as well as a proper new studio album in 2019 called Escalating Quickly.

== Discography ==
=== As Scared Straight ===
- Nardcore Compilation LP, Mystic Records 1984
- Party Animal - We got Power II, Compilation LP, Mystic 1984
- Mystic Super Seven Sampler No. 1, Compilation 7", Mystic 1985
- Born to be Wild 7", Mystic 1985
- You Drink, You Drive, You Die LP, Mystic 1988

=== As Ten Foot Pole ===
- (1993) Swill
- (1994) Rev
- (1995) Ten Foot Pole & Satanic Surfers (split EP)
- (1997) Unleashed
- (1999) Insider
- (2002) Bad Mother Trucker
- (2004) Subliminable Messages
- (2017) Setlist
- (2019) Escalating Quickly
- (2020) Simmer Down
- (2022) Winning
