= Pulley (band) =

American punk rock band

- Origin: Simi Valley, California, U.S.
- Genres: Punk rock; skate punk; melodic hardcore
- Years active: 1994–present
- Label: X-Members - When's Lunch Records - Epitaph - Cyber Tracks - SBÄM Records
- Members: Scott Radinsky; Mike Harder; Trey Clinesmith; Tyler Rebbe; Sean Sellers
- Past members: Jordan Burns; Jim Cherry; Matt Riddle; Tony Palermo; Bob Gilmore; Jim Blowers; Chris Dalley
- Website: Official Website

Pulley is an American punk rock band, formed in 1994. The band is known for straightforward, hard-edged melodic punk rock. AllMusic said they were a punk revival band.

== Band history ==
The band was formed upon vocalist Scott Radinsky's departure from Ten Foot Pole, brought about by that band's desire for a singer with a full-time focus on music (Radinsky was also a major-league relief pitcher and has played for the Los Angeles Dodgers, among others). Pulley's initial lineup included Strung Out drummer Jordan Burns, guitarist Jim Cherry (former bassist of Strung Out and, later, Zero Down), guitarist Mike Harder, and former Face to Face bassist Matt Riddle. Pulley's debut album, Esteem Driven Engine, was released in 1996 by Epitaph Records. Riddle later joined No Use for a Name full-time and was replaced by Tyler Rebbe. Follow-ups included 60 Cycle Hum (1997), @ !* (1999), Together Again for the First Time (2001), and Matters (2004). In August 2008, the band announced their departure from Epitaph. In November 2008, the band went on a short West Coast tour with No Use for a Name. Preceded by a stream of "Mandarin", Pulley released the EP Time-Insensitive Material on March 24, 2009, on the band's own label, X-Members.

In December 2010, Pulley announced plans to enter the studio in January 2011 to record a new album with producer Matt Hyde. At that time, there was no word on what label would release the album or if it would be self-released by the band like the Time-Insensitive Material EP. On January 2, 2011, the band announced on their Facebook that recording would begin on January 14; however, on January 6, they posted a message on their Facebook saying, "It's our final rehearsal tonight before we go into the studio to record. We got the song structures worked out so now we just have to play them over and over again, they say practice makes perfect." On April 4, 2011, Pulley announced via their Facebook page that they would be releasing a new EP, The Long and the Short of It, on June 28, 2011.

On September 28, 2016, El Hefe-owned record label Cyber Tracks announced that they had signed Pulley, and released their first studio album in 12 years, No Change in the Weather, on November 18. The release of this album marked the band's 20th anniversary.

Sean Sellers of Good Riddance behind the drum kit since 2021.

== Band members ==
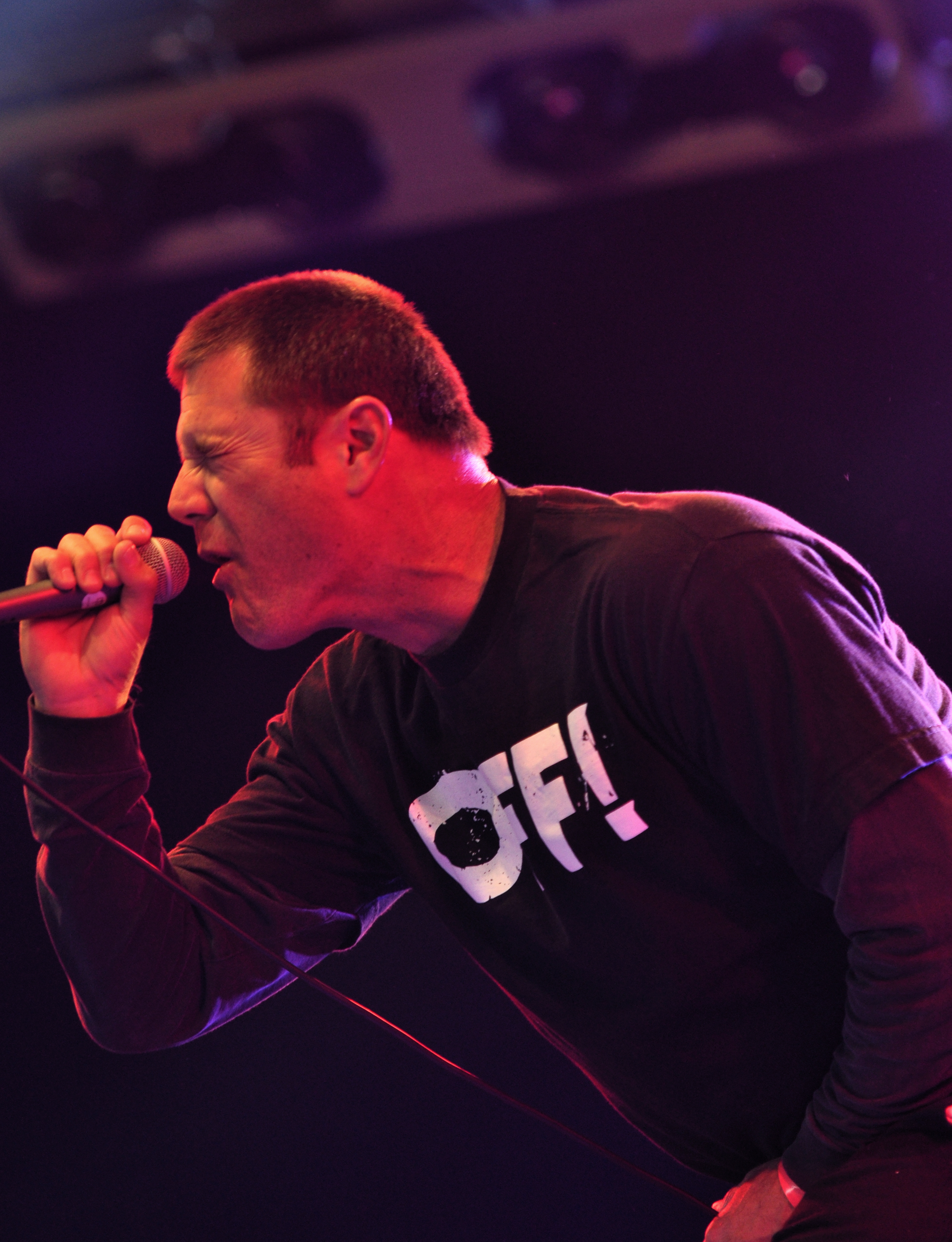
Scott Radinsky

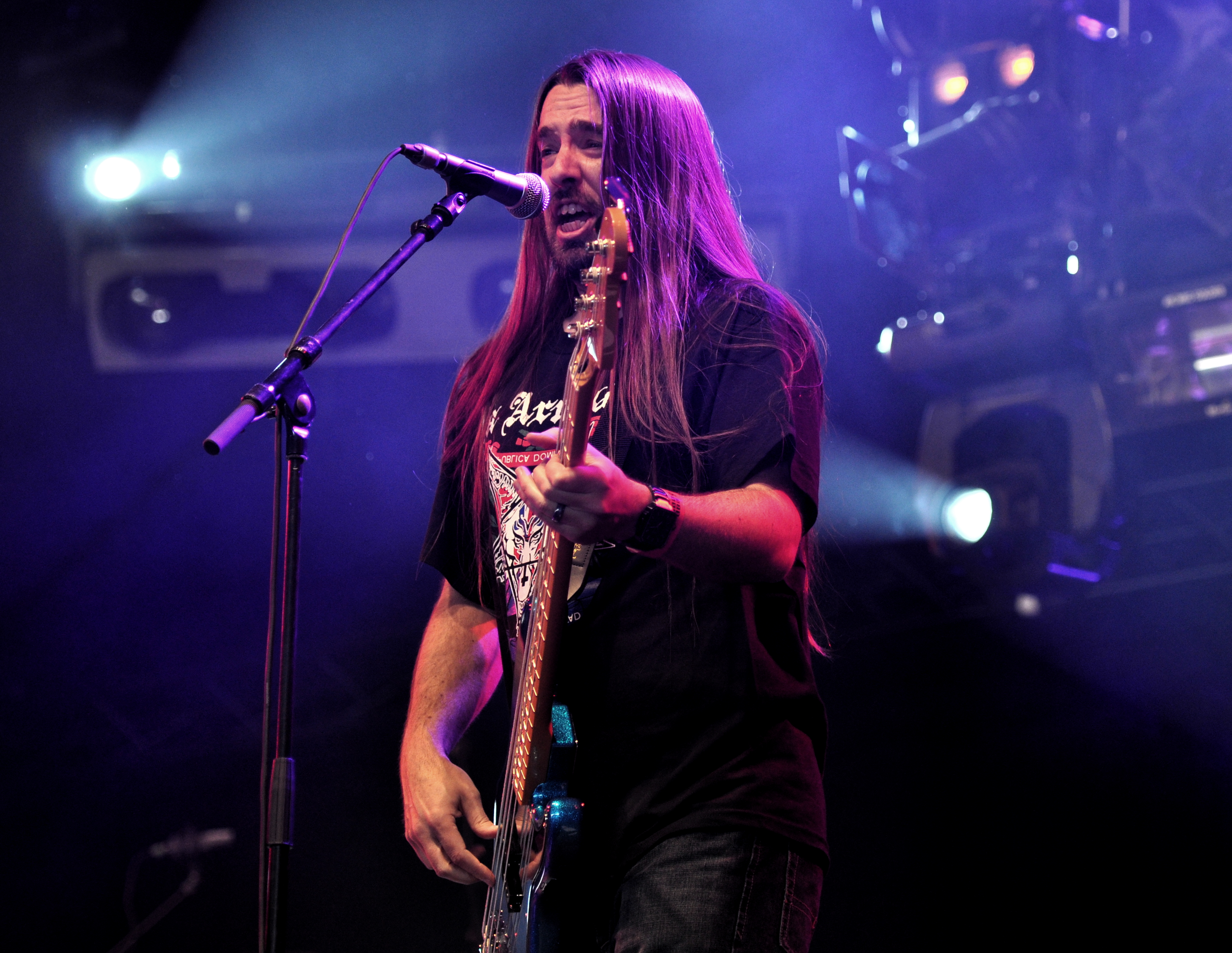
Tyler Rebbe

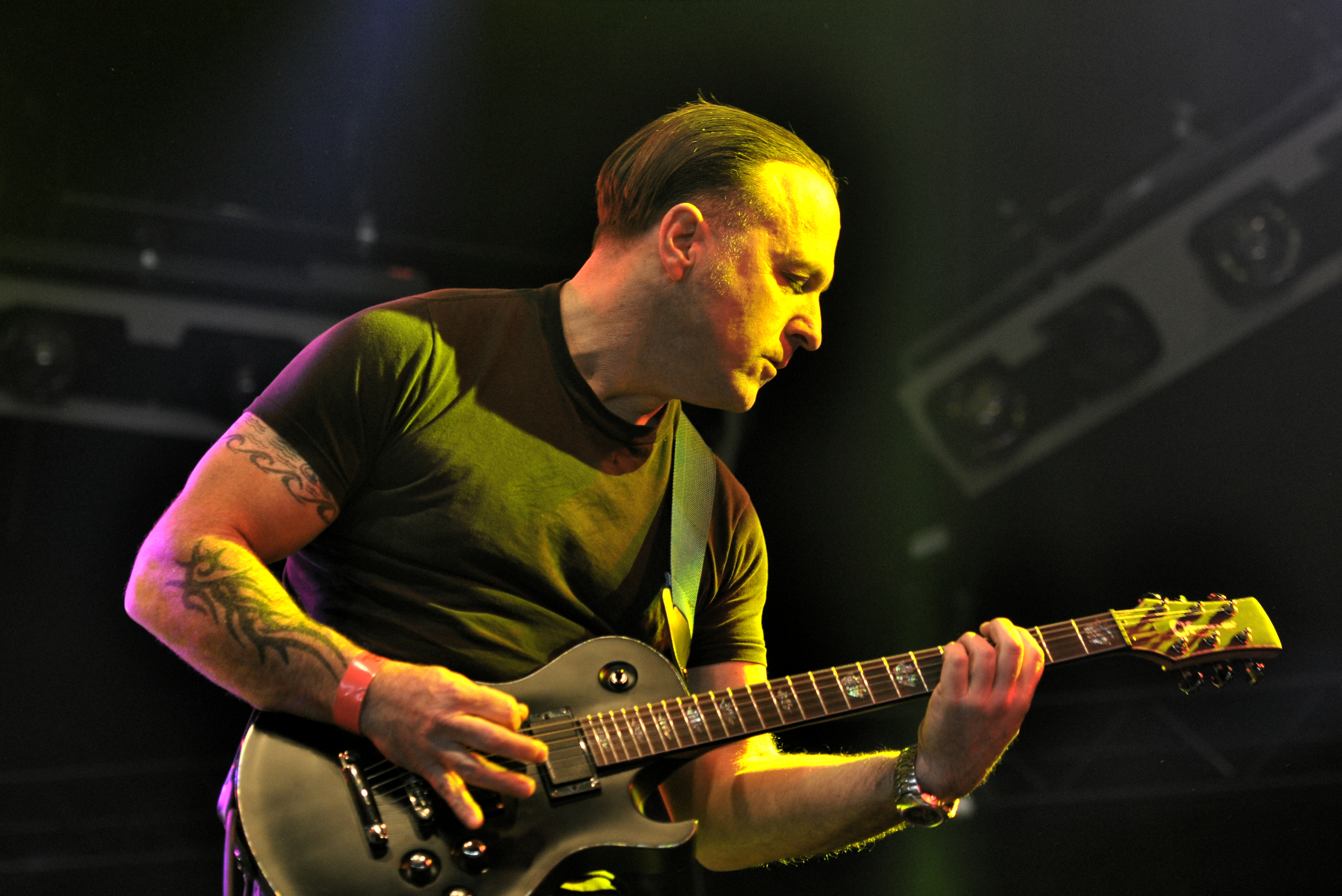
Jim Blowers

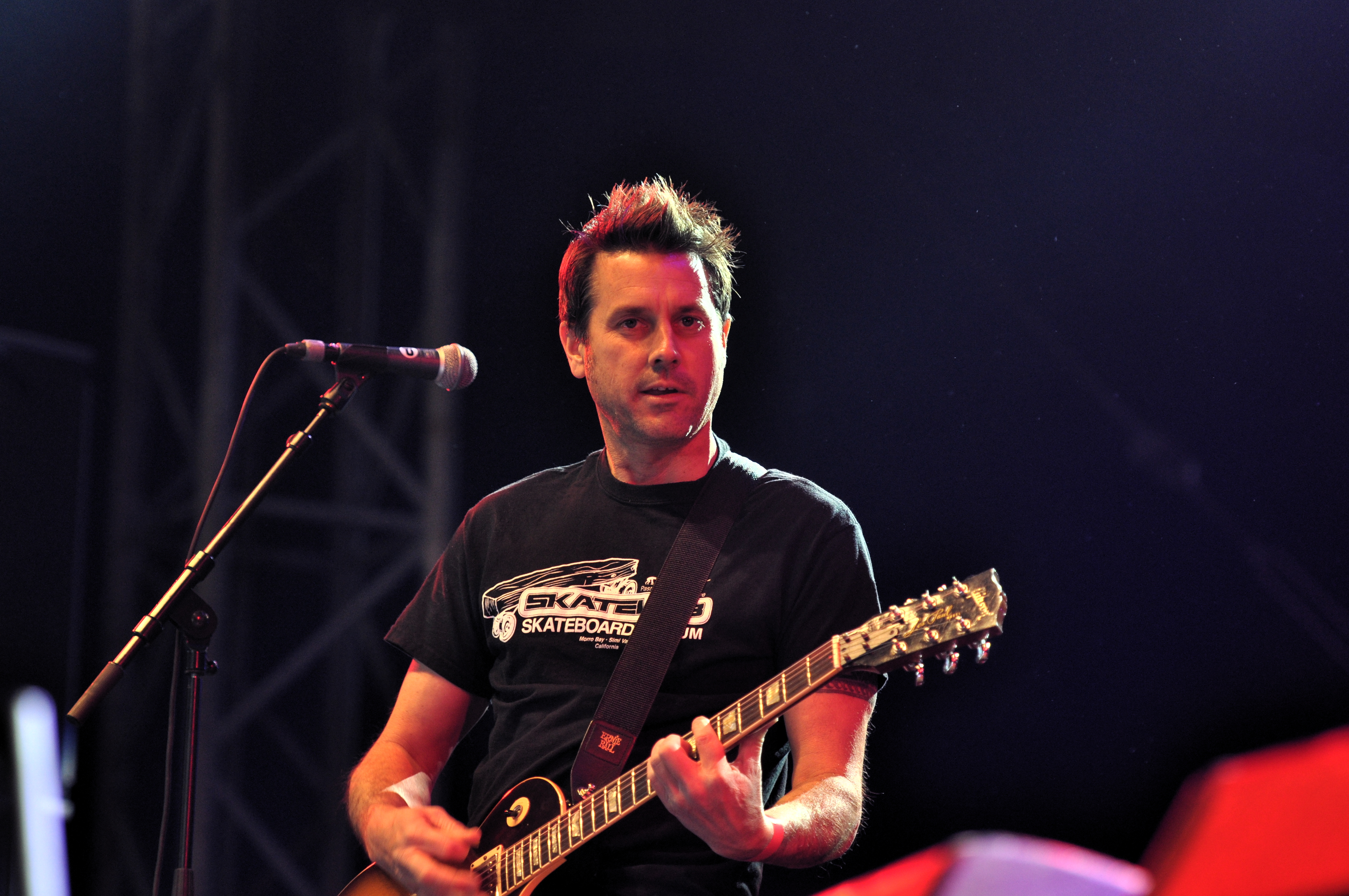
Mike Harder

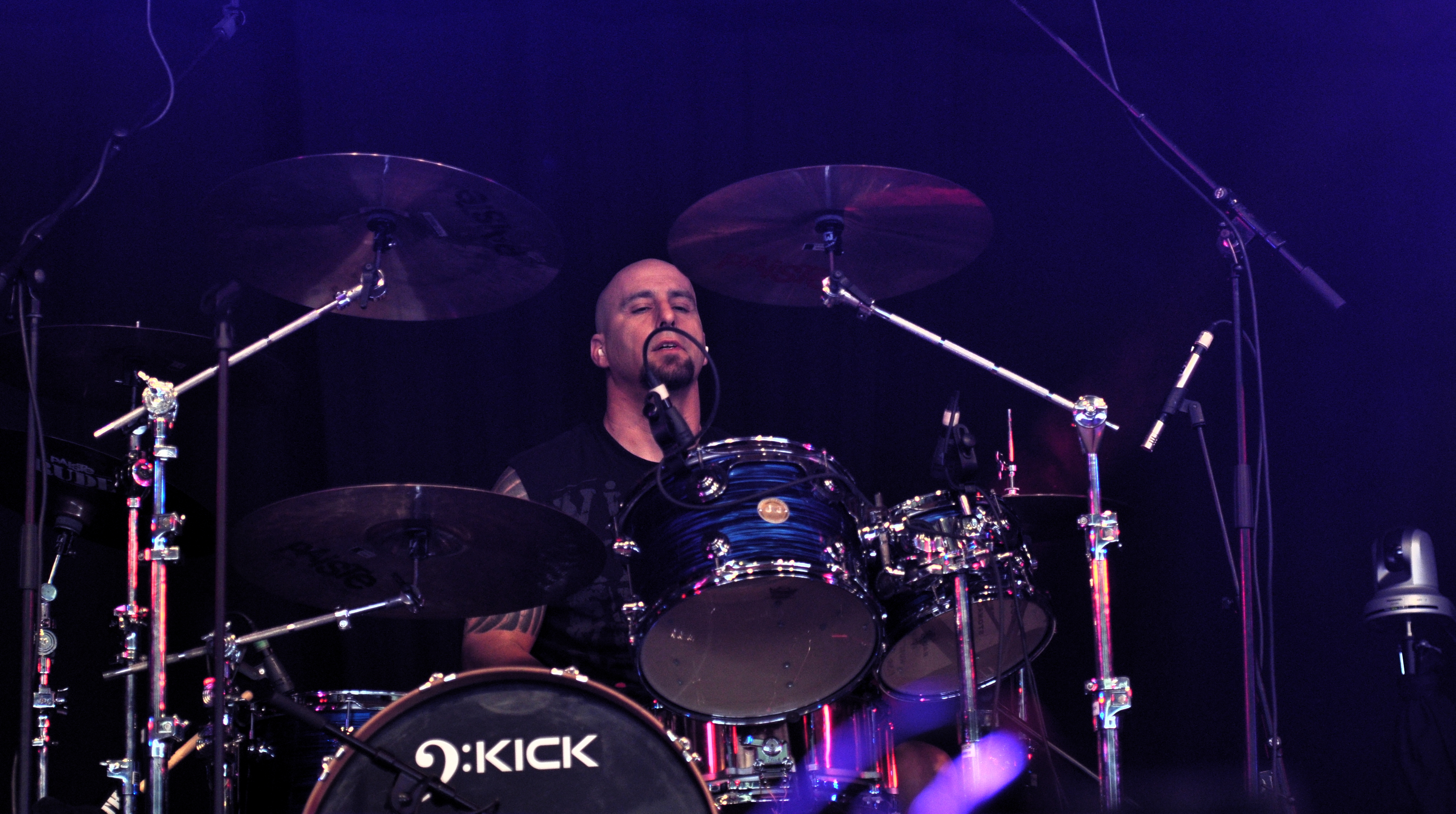
Bob Gilmore (2009-2013)

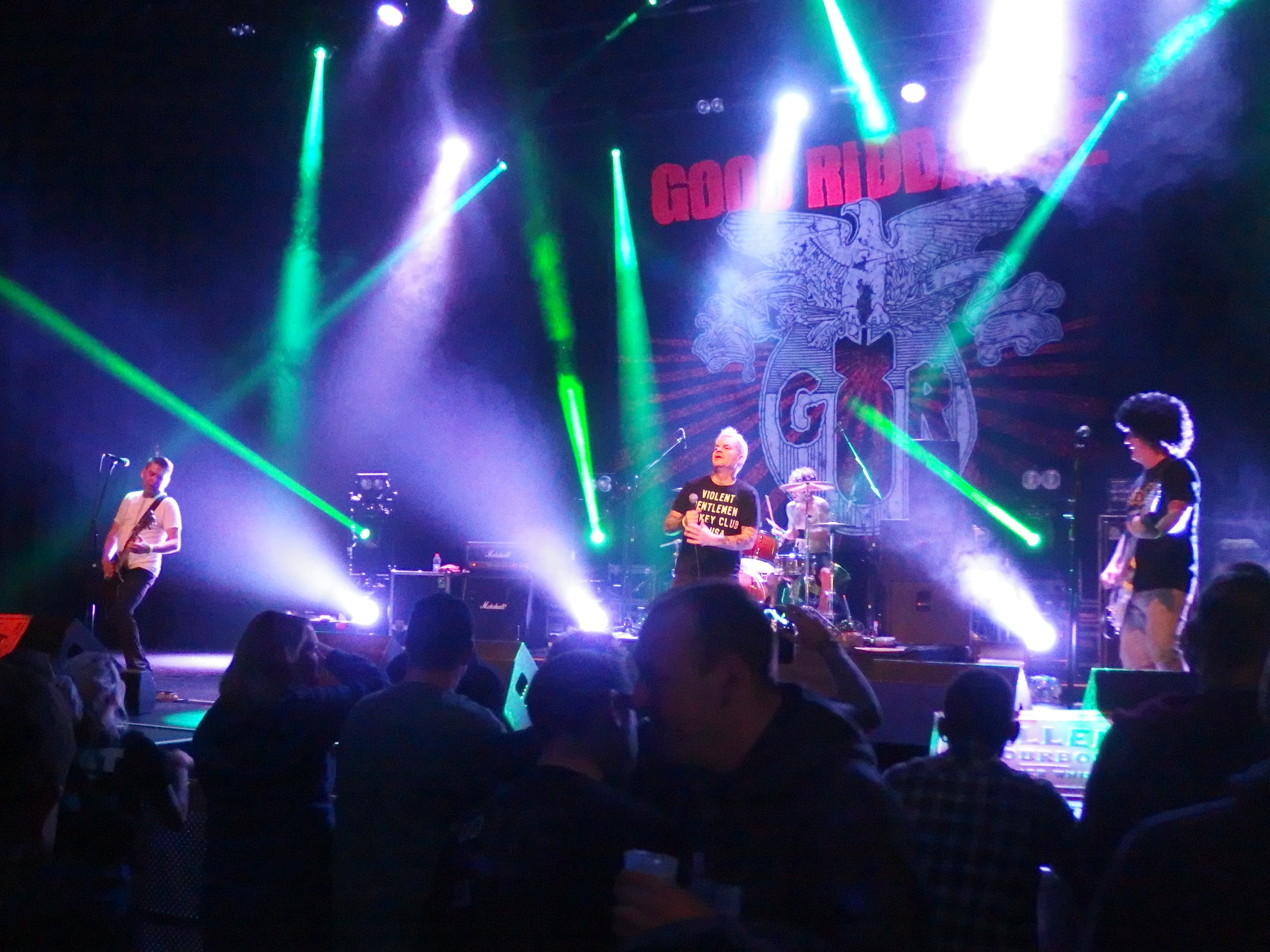
Sean Sellers (Drums)

Current

- Scott Radinsky – lead vocals (1994–present)
- Mike Harder – guitar (1994–present)
- Trey Clinesmith – guitar (2019–present)
- Tyler Rebbe – bass (1998–present)
- Sean Sellers – drums (2021–present)

Former

- Jim Cherry – guitar (1994–2001; died 2002), bass (1997–1998)
- Matt Riddle – bass (1994–1997)
- Jordan Burns – drums (1994–2000)
- Tony Palermo – drums (2000–2009)
- Jim Blowers – guitar (2001–2019)
- Bob Gilmore – drums (2009–2013)
- Chris Dalley – drums (2013–2021)

Timeline

== Discography ==
Studio albums

- Esteem Driven Engine (1996)
- 60 Cycle Hum (1997)
- @#!* (1999)
- Together Again for the First Time (2001)
- Matters (2004)
- No Change in the Weather (2016)
- The Golden Life (2022)

Live albums

- Beyond Warped (2006)
- Encore (2021)

EPs

- Time-Insensitive Material (2009)
- The Long and the Short of It (2011)
- Different Strings (2021)

Splits

- The Slackers/Pulley Split (2004)
- Pulley/Firesale Split (2025)
