= Isotopy of an algebra =

In mathematics, an isotopy from a possibly non-associative algebra A to another is a triple of bijective linear maps (a, b, c) such that if xy = z then a(x)b(y) = c(z). This is similar to the definition of an isotopy of loops, except that it must also preserve the linear structure of the algebra. For a = b = c this is the same as an isomorphism. The autotopy group of an algebra is the group of all isotopies to itself (sometimes called autotopies), which contains the group of automorphisms as a subgroup.

Isotopy of algebras was introduced by Albert (1942), who was inspired by work of Steenrod. Some authors use a slightly different definition that an isotopy is a triple of bijective linear maps a, b, c such that if xyz = 1 then a(x)b(y)c(z) = 1. For alternative division algebras such as the octonions the two definitions of isotopy are equivalent, but in general they are not.

== Examples ==
- If a = b = c is an isomorphism then the triple (a, b, c) is an isotopy. Conversely, if the algebras have identity elements 1 that are preserved by the maps a and b of an isotopy, then a = b = c is an isomorphism.
- If A is an associative algebra with identity and a and c are left multiplication by some fixed invertible element, and b is the identity then (a, b, c) is an isotopy. Similarly we could take b and c to be right multiplication by some invertible element and take a to be the identity. These form two commuting subgroups of the autotopy group, and the full autotopy group is generated by these two subgroups and the automorphism group.
- If an algebra (not assumed to be associative) with an identity element is isotopic to an associative algebra with an identity element, then the two algebras are isomorphic. In particular two associative algebras with identity elements are isotopic if and only if they are isomorphic. However associative algebras with identity elements can be isotopic to algebras without identity elements.
- The autotopy group of the octonions is the spin group Spin_{8}, much larger than its automorphism group G_{2}.
- If B is a mutation of the associative algebra A by an invertible element, then there is an isotopy from A to B.
- If a, b, and c are any invertible linear maps of an algebra, and one defines a new product c^{−1}(a(x)b(y)), then the algebra defined by this new product is isotopic to the original algebra. For example, the complex numbers with the product xy̅ is isotopic to the complex numbers with the usual product, even though it is not commutative and has no identity element.
