= Isotopy of loops =

In the mathematical field of abstract algebra, isotopy is an equivalence relation used to classify the algebraic notion of loop.

Isotopy for loops and quasigroups was introduced by Albert (1943), based on his slightly earlier definition of isotopy for algebras, which was in turn inspired by work of Steenrod.

== Isotopy of quasigroups ==
Each quasigroup is isotopic to a loop.

Let $(Q,\cdot)$ and $(P,\circ)$ be quasigroups. A quasigroup homotopy from Q to P is a triple (α, β, γ) of maps from Q to P such that

$$\alpha(x)\circ\beta(y) = \gamma(x\cdot y)\,$$

for all x, y in Q. A quasigroup homomorphism is just a homotopy for which the three maps are equal.

An isotopy is a homotopy for which each of the three maps (α, β, γ) is a bijection. Two quasigroups are isotopic if there is an isotopy between them. In terms of Latin squares, an isotopy (α, β, γ) is given by a permutation of rows α, a permutation of columns β, and a permutation on the underlying element set γ.

An autotopy is an isotopy from a quasigroup $(Q,\cdot)$ to itself. The set of all autotopies of a quasigroup form a group with the automorphism group as a subgroup.

A principal isotopy is an isotopy for which γ is the identity map on Q. In this case the underlying sets of the quasigroups must be the same but the multiplications may differ.

== Isotopy of loops ==
Let $(L,\cdot)$ and $(K,\circ)$ be loops and let $(\alpha,\beta,\gamma):L \to K$ be an isotopy. Then it is the product of the principal isotopy $(\alpha_0,\beta_0,id)$ from $(L,\cdot)$ and $(L,*)$ and the isomorphism $\gamma$ between $(L,*)$ and $(K,\circ)$. Indeed, put $\alpha_0=\gamma^{-1} \alpha$, $\beta_0=\gamma^{-1} \beta$ and define the operation $*$ by $x*y=\alpha^{-1}\gamma(x)\cdot \beta^{-1}\gamma(y)$.

Let $(L,\cdot)$ and $(L,\circ)$ be loops and let e be the neutral element of $(L,\cdot)$. Let $(\alpha,\beta,id)$ a principal isotopy from $(L,\cdot)$ to $(L,\circ)$. Then $\alpha=R_b^{-1}$ and $\beta=L_a^{-1}$ where $a=\alpha(e)$ and $b=\beta(e)$.

A loop L is a G-loop if it is isomorphic to all its loop isotopes.

== Pseudo-automorphisms of loops ==
Let L be a loop and c an element of L. A bijection α of L is called a right pseudo-automorphism of L with companion element c if for all x, y the identity

$$\alpha(xy)c=\alpha(x)(\alpha(y)c)$$

holds. One defines left pseudo-automorphisms analogously.

== Universal properties ==
We say that a loop property P is universal if it is isotopy invariant, that is, P holds for a loop L if and only if P holds for all loop isotopes of L. Clearly, it is enough to check if P holds for all principal isotopes of L.

For example, since the isotopes of a commutative loop need not be commutative, commutativity is not universal. However, associativity and being an abelian group are universal properties. In fact, every group is a G-loop.

== The geometric interpretation of isotopy ==
Given a loop L, one can define an incidence geometric structure called a 3-net. Conversely, after fixing an origin and an order of the line classes, a 3-net gives rise to a loop. Choosing a different origin or exchanging the line classes may result in nonisomorphic coordinate loops. However, the coordinate loops are always isotopic. In other words, two loops are isotopic if and only if they are equivalent from geometric point of view.

The dictionary between algebraic and geometric concepts is as follows

- The group of autotopism of the loop corresponds to the group direction preserving collineations of the 3-net.
- Pseudo-automorphisms correspond to collineations fixing the two axes of the coordinate system.
- The set of companion elements is the orbit of the stabilizer of the axis in the collineation group.
- The loop is G-loop if and only if the collineation group acts transitively on the set of point of the 3-net.
- The property P is universal if and only if it is independent on the choice of the origin.

== See also ==
- Isotopy of an algebra
