= Mellen Woodman Haskell =

American mathematician

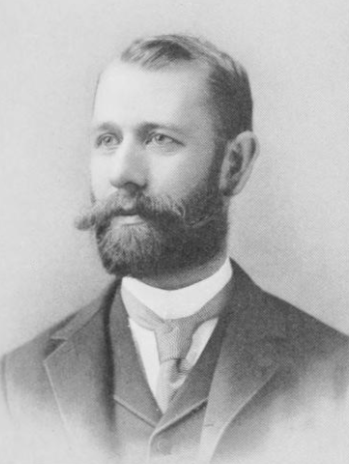
- Born: March 17, 1863; Salem, Massachusetts, US
- Died: January 15, 1948 (aged 84); Berkeley, California, US
- Education: Harvard University; University of Göttingen
- Known for: Hyperbolic functions
- Spouse: Isabel Woodford Brown (m. 1928)
- Scientific career
- Fields: Mathematics
- Workplaces: University of Michigan; University of California, Berkeley
- Doctoral advisor: Felix Klein
- Doctoral students: Benjamin A. Bernstein; Annie Biddle; Charles H. Smiley

Mellen Woodman Haskell (March 17, 1863 – January 15, 1948) was an American mathematician, specializing in geometry, group theory, and applications of group theory to geometry.

== Education and career ==
After secondary education at Roxbury Latin School, he received in 1883 his bachelor's degree and in 1885 his M.A. and a Parker Traveling Fellowship from Harvard University. From 1885 to 1889 he studied mathematics at the University of Leipzig and the University of Göttingen, where in 1889 he received, under Felix Klein, his Dr. phil. In 1889 Haskell became an instructor at the University of Michigan.

In 1890 he was hired by the University of California, Berkeley as an assistant professor. He was promoted to associate professor in 1894, and in 1906 to professor. In 1909 he became the chair of U. C. Berkeley's mathematics department in succession to Irving Stringham, and remained the chair until retiring as professor emeritus in 1933.

Haskell provided a foundation for hyperbolic angle and hyperbolic functions with his article in Bulletin of American Mathematical Society in 1895. In particular, he identified the angle with area of a hyperbolic sector, and showed its invariance under squeeze mapping.

Haskell was an Invited Speaker of the International Congress of Mathematicians in 1924 in Toronto and in 1928 in Bologna.

== Personal life ==
Haskell married Isabel Woodford Brown in 1928.

He died in Berkeley on January 15, 1948.

== Selected publications ==
- 1890: "Ueber die zu der Curve λ^{3}μ+ μ^{3}ν+ μ^{3}λ= 0 im projectiven Sinne gehörende mehrfache Ueberdeckung der Ebene", American Journal of Mathematics : 1–52. doi:10.2307/2369597
- 1892: "Note on resultants", Bulletin of the American Mathematical Society 1: 223–224. MR 1557188
- 1893: "On the definition of logarithms", Bulletin of the American Mathematical Society 2: 164–167. MR 1557235
- 1895: On the introduction of the notion of hyperbolic functions, Bulletin of the American Mathematical Society 1: 155–159, from Project Euclid MR 1557371
- 1903: "On a Certain Rational Cubic Transformation in Space", The American Mathematical Monthly 10(1): 1–3.
- 1903; "Generalization of a Fundamental Theorem in the Geometry of the Triangle", The American Mathematical Monthly 10(2): 30–33.
- 1905: "The construction of conics under given conditions", Bulletin of the American Mathematical Society 11: 268–273. MR 1558211
- 1906: "The resolution of any collineation into perspective reflections", Transactions of the American Mathematical Society 7: 361–369. MR 1500754
- 1917: "The maximum number of cusps of an algebraic plane curve, and enumeration of self-dual curves", Bulletin of the American Mathematical Society 23: 164–165. MR 1559901

=== As translator ===
- 1893: Felix Klein, "A comparative review of recent researches in geometry", Bulletin of the American Mathematical Society 2: 215–249, from Project Euclid MR 1557253 (See also Erlangen program.)
