= Inverse hyperbolic functions =

Mathematical functions

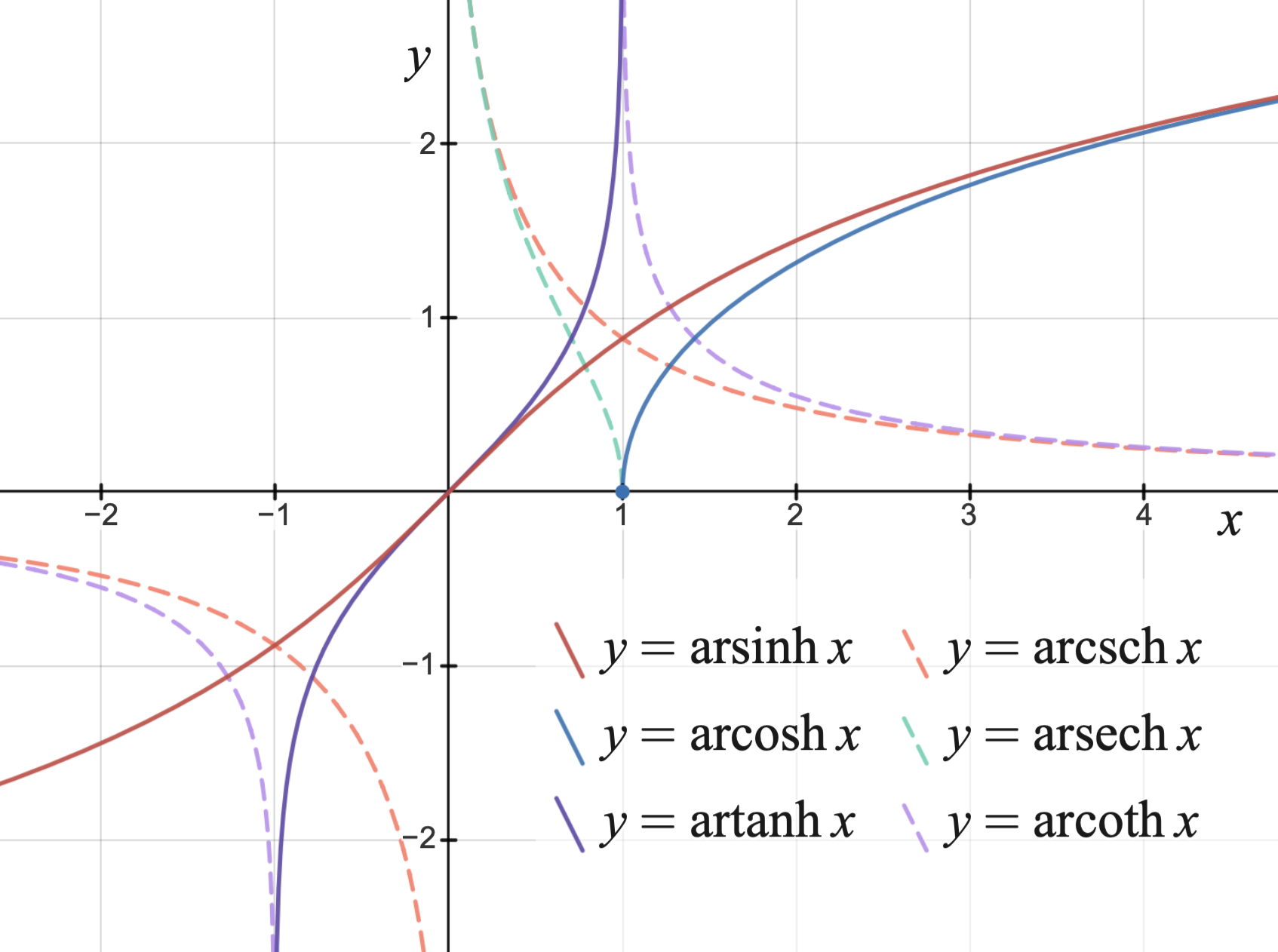
Graphs of the inverse hyperbolic functions

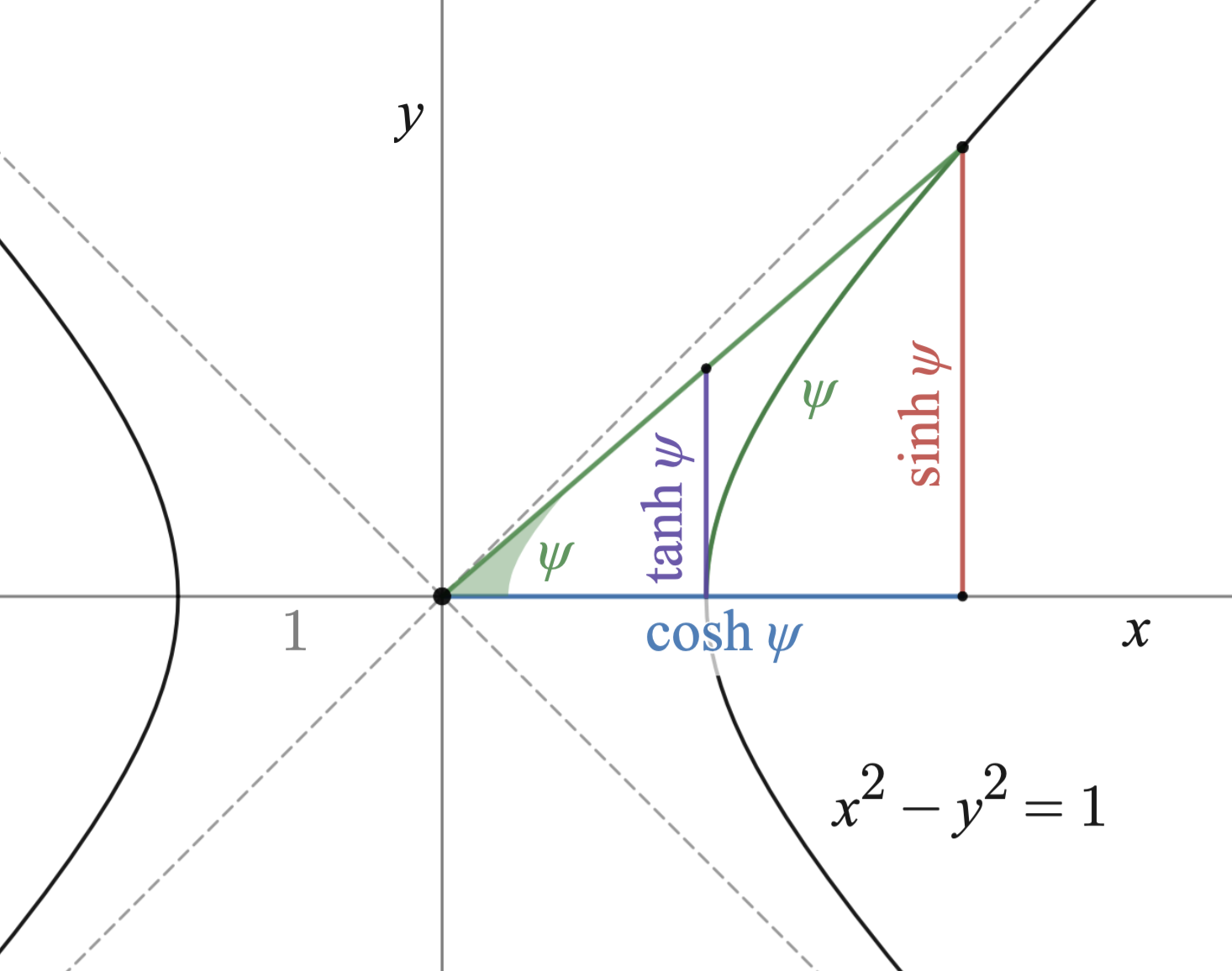
The hyperbolic functions sinh, cosh, and tanh with respect to a unit hyperbola are analogous to circular functions sin, cos, tan with respect to a unit circle. The argument to the hyperbolic functions is a hyperbolic angle measure.

In mathematics, the inverse hyperbolic functions are inverses of the hyperbolic functions, analogous to the inverse circular functions. There are six in common use: inverse hyperbolic sine, inverse hyperbolic cosine, inverse hyperbolic tangent, inverse hyperbolic cosecant, inverse hyperbolic secant, and inverse hyperbolic cotangent. They are commonly denoted by the symbols for the hyperbolic functions, prefixed with arc- or ar- or with a superscript ${-1}$ (for example arcsinh, arsinh, or $\sinh^{-1}$).

For a given value of a hyperbolic function, the inverse hyperbolic function provides the corresponding hyperbolic angle measure, for example $\operatorname{arsinh}(\sinh a) = a$ and $\sinh(\operatorname{arsinh} x) = x.$ Hyperbolic angle measure is the length of an arc of a unit hyperbola $x^2 - y^2 = 1$ as measured in the Lorentzian plane (not the length of a hyperbolic arc in the Euclidean plane), and twice the area of the corresponding hyperbolic sector. This is analogous to the way circular angle measure is the arc length of an arc of the unit circle in the Euclidean plane or twice the area of the corresponding circular sector. Alternately hyperbolic angle is the area of a sector of the hyperbola $xy = 1.$ Some authors call the inverse hyperbolic functions hyperbolic area functions.

Hyperbolic functions occur in the calculation of angles and distances in hyperbolic geometry. They also occur in the solutions of many linear differential equations (such as the equation defining a catenary), cubic equations, and Laplace's equation in Cartesian coordinates. Laplace's equations are important in many areas of physics, including electromagnetic theory, heat transfer, fluid dynamics, and special relativity.

== Notation ==
A ray through the unit hyperbola x^{2} − y^{2} = 1 in the point (cosh a, sinh a), where a is twice the area between the ray, the hyperbola, and the x-axis

The earliest and most widely adopted symbols use the prefix arc- (that is: arcsinh, arccosh, arctanh, arcsech, arccsch, arccoth), by analogy with the inverse circular functions (arcsin, etc.). For a unit hyperbola ("Lorentzian circle") in the Lorentzian plane (pseudo-Euclidean plane of signature (1, 1)) or in the hyperbolic number plane, the hyperbolic angle measure (argument to the hyperbolic functions) is indeed the arc length of a hyperbolic arc.

Also common is the notation $\sinh^{-1},$ $\cosh^{-1},$ etc., although care must be taken to avoid misinterpretations of the superscript −1 as an exponent. The standard convention is that $\sinh^{-1} x$ or $\sinh^{-1}(x)$ means the inverse function while $(\sinh x)^{-1}$ or $\sinh(x)^{-1}$ means the reciprocal $1 / \sinh x.$ Especially inconsistent is the conventional use of positive integer superscripts to indicate an exponent rather than function composition, e.g. $\sinh^{2} x$ conventionally means $(\sinh x)^2$ and not $\sinh(\sinh x).$

Because the argument of hyperbolic functions is not the arc length of a hyperbolic arc in the Euclidean plane, some authors have condemned the prefix arc-, arguing that the prefix ar- (for 'area') or arg- (for 'argument') should be preferred. Following this recommendation, the ISO 80000-2 standard abbreviations use the prefix ar- (that is: arsinh, arcosh, artanh, arsech, arcsch, arcoth).

In computer programming languages, inverse circular and hyperbolic functions are often named with the shorter prefix a- (asinh, etc.).

This article will consistently adopt the prefix ar- for convenience.

== Definitions in terms of logarithms ==
Since the hyperbolic functions are quadratic rational functions of the exponential function $\exp x,$ they may be solved using the quadratic formula and then written in terms of the natural logarithm.

$$\begin{align}
\operatorname{arsinh} x &= \ln \left(x + \sqrt{x^2 + 1}\right)               & -\infty &< x < \infty, \\[10mu]
\operatorname{arcosh} x &= \ln \left(x + \sqrt{x^2 - 1}\right)               & 1 &\leq x < \infty, \\[10mu]
\operatorname{artanh} x &= \frac12\ln\frac{1+x}{1-x}                         & -1 &< x < 1, \\[10mu]
\operatorname{arcsch} x &= \ln \left(\frac1x + \sqrt{\frac1{x^2} + 1}\right) & -\infty &< x < \infty, \ x \neq 0, \\[10mu]
\operatorname{arsech} x &= \ln \left(\frac1x + \sqrt{\frac1{x^2} - 1}\right) & 0 &< x \leq 1, \\[10mu]
\operatorname{arcoth} x &= \frac12\ln\frac{x+1}{x-1}                         & -\infty &< x < -1\ \ \text{or}\ \ 1 < x < \infty.
\end{align}$$

For complex arguments, the inverse circular and hyperbolic functions, the square root, and the natural logarithm are all multi-valued functions.

== Addition formulae ==
$$\operatorname{arsinh} u \pm \operatorname{arsinh} v = \operatorname{arsinh} \left(u \sqrt{1 + v^2} \pm v \sqrt{1 + u^2}\right)$$
$$\operatorname{arcosh} u \pm \operatorname{arcosh} v = \operatorname{arcosh} \left(u v \pm \sqrt{(u^2 - 1) (v^2 - 1)}\right)$$
$$\operatorname{artanh} u \pm \operatorname{artanh} v = \operatorname{artanh} \left( \frac{u \pm v}{1 \pm uv} \right)$$
$$\operatorname{arcoth} u \pm \operatorname{arcoth} v = \operatorname{arcoth} \left( \frac{1 \pm uv}{u \pm v} \right)$$
$$\begin{align}\operatorname{arsinh} u + \operatorname{arcosh} v & = \operatorname{arsinh} \left(u v + \sqrt{(1 + u^2) (v^2 - 1)}\right) \\
& = \operatorname{arcosh} \left(v \sqrt{1 + u^2} + u \sqrt{v^2 - 1}\right) \end{align}$$

== Other identities ==
$$\begin{align}
2\operatorname{arcosh}x&=\operatorname{arcosh}(2x^2-1)      &\quad \hbox{ for }x\geq 1 \\
4\operatorname{arcosh}x&=\operatorname{arcosh}(8x^4-8x^2+1) &\quad \hbox{ for }x\geq 1 \\
2\operatorname{arsinh}x&=\pm\operatorname{arcosh}(2x^2+1) \\
4\operatorname{arsinh}x&=\operatorname{arcosh}(8x^4+8x^2+1) &\quad \hbox{ for }x\geq 0
\end{align}$$

$$\ln(x) = \operatorname{arcosh} \left( \frac{x^2 + 1}{2x}\right)  = \operatorname{arsinh} \left( \frac{x^2 - 1}{2x}\right)
= \operatorname{artanh} \left( \frac{x^2 - 1}{x^2 + 1}\right)$$

== Composition of hyperbolic and inverse hyperbolic functions ==
$$\begin{align}
&\sinh(\operatorname{arcosh}x) = \sqrt{x^{2} - 1}  \quad \text{for} \quad |x| > 1 \\
&\sinh(\operatorname{artanh}x) = \frac{x}{\sqrt{1-x^{2}}} \quad \text{for} \quad -1 < x < 1 \\
&\cosh(\operatorname{arsinh}x) = \sqrt{1+x^{2}} \\
&\cosh(\operatorname{artanh}x) = \frac{1}{\sqrt{1-x^{2}}} \quad \text{for} \quad -1 < x < 1 \\
&\tanh(\operatorname{arsinh}x) = \frac{x}{\sqrt{1+x^{2}}} \\
&\tanh(\operatorname{arcosh}x) = \frac{\sqrt{x^{2} - 1}}{x} \quad \text{for} \quad |x| > 1
\end{align}$$

== Composition of inverse hyperbolic and circular functions ==
$$\operatorname{arsinh} \left( \tan  \alpha \right)
= \operatorname{artanh} \left( \sin  \alpha  \right)
= \ln\left( \frac{ 1 + \sin  \alpha }{ \cos  \alpha } \right)
= \pm \operatorname{arcosh} \left( \frac {1} {\cos \alpha  }\right)$$

$\ln \left( \left| \tan \alpha \right|\right) = -\operatorname{artanh} \left( \cos 2 \alpha \right)$

== Conversions ==
$$\ln x = \operatorname{artanh} \left( \frac{x^2-1}{x^2+1}\right)
= \operatorname{arsinh} \left( \frac{x^2-1}{2 x}\right)
= \operatorname{sgn}(x-1) \operatorname{arcosh} \left( \frac{x^2+1}{2 x}\right)$$

$$\operatorname{artanh} x
= \operatorname{arsinh} \left( \frac{x}{\sqrt{1-x^2}}\right)
= \operatorname{sgn}x \operatorname{arcosh} \left( \frac{1}{\sqrt{1-x^2}}\right)$$

$$\operatorname{arsinh} x
= \operatorname{artanh} \left( \frac{x}{\sqrt{1+x^2}}\right)
= \operatorname{sgn}x \operatorname{arcosh} \left( \sqrt{1+x^2}\right)$$

$$\operatorname{arcosh} x
= \left| \operatorname{arsinh} \left( \sqrt{x^2-1}\right) \right|
=  \left| \operatorname{artanh} \left(  \frac{\sqrt{x^2-1}}{x}
\right) \right|$$

== Derivatives ==
$$\begin{align}
\frac{d}{dx} \operatorname{arsinh} x & {}= \frac{1}{\sqrt{x^2+1}}, \text{ for all real } x\\
\frac{d}{dx} \operatorname{arcosh} x & {}= \frac{1}{\sqrt{x^2-1}}, \text{ for all real } x>1\\
\frac{d}{dx} \operatorname{artanh} x & {}= \frac{1}{1-x^2}, \text{ for all real } |x|<1\\
\frac{d}{dx} \operatorname{arcoth} x & {}= \frac{1}{1-x^2}, \text{ for all real } |x|>1\\
\frac{d}{dx} \operatorname{arsech} x & {}= \frac{-1}{x\sqrt{1-x^2}}, \text{ for all real } x \in (0,1)\\
\frac{d}{dx} \operatorname{arcsch} x & {}= \frac{-1}{|x|\sqrt{1+x^2}}, \text{ for all real } x\text{, except } 0\\
\end{align}$$

These formulas can be derived in terms of the derivatives of hyperbolic functions. For example, if $x = \sinh \theta$, then $dx/d\theta = \cosh \theta = \sqrt{1+x^2},$ so
$$\frac{d}{dx}\operatorname{arsinh}(x) = \frac{d \theta}{dx} = \frac{1}{dx/d\theta} = \frac{1}{\sqrt{1+x^2}}.$$

== Series expansions ==
Expansion series can be obtained for the above functions:

$$\begin{align}\operatorname{arsinh} x & = x - \left( \frac {1} {2} \right) \frac {x^3} {3} + \left( \frac {1 \cdot 3} {2 \cdot 4} \right) \frac {x^5} {5} - \left( \frac {1 \cdot 3 \cdot 5} {2 \cdot 4 \cdot 6} \right) \frac {x^7} {7} \pm\cdots \\
& = \sum_{n=0}^\infty \left( \frac {(-1)^n(2n)!} {2^{2n}(n!)^2} \right) \frac {x^{2n+1}} {2n+1} , \qquad \left| x \right| < 1  \end{align}$$

$$\begin{align}\operatorname{arcosh} x & = \ln(2x) - \left( \left( \frac {1} {2} \right) \frac {x^{-2}} {2} + \left( \frac {1 \cdot 3} {2 \cdot 4} \right) \frac {x^{-4}} {4} + \left( \frac {1 \cdot 3 \cdot 5} {2 \cdot 4 \cdot 6} \right) \frac {x^{-6}} {6} +\cdots \right) \\
& = \ln(2x) - \sum_{n=1}^\infty \left( \frac {(2n)!} {2^{2n}(n!)^2} \right) \frac {x^{-2n}} {2n} , \qquad \left| x \right| > 1 \end{align}$$

$$\begin{align}\operatorname{artanh} x & = x + \frac {x^3} {3} + \frac {x^5} {5} + \frac {x^7} {7} +\cdots \\
& = \sum_{n=0}^\infty \frac {x^{2n+1}} {2n+1} , \qquad \left| x \right| < 1 \end{align}$$

$$\begin{align}\operatorname{arcsch} x = \operatorname{arsinh} \frac1x & = x^{-1} - \left( \frac {1} {2} \right) \frac {x^{-3}} {3} + \left( \frac {1 \cdot 3} {2 \cdot 4} \right) \frac {x^{-5}} {5} - \left( \frac {1 \cdot 3 \cdot 5} {2 \cdot 4 \cdot 6} \right) \frac {x^{-7}} {7} \pm\cdots \\
& = \sum_{n=0}^\infty \left( \frac {(-1)^n(2n)!} {2^{2n}(n!)^2} \right) \frac {x^{-(2n+1)}} {2n+1} , \qquad \left| x \right| > 1 \end{align}$$

$$\begin{align}\operatorname{arsech} x = \operatorname{arcosh} \frac1x & = \ln \frac{2}{x} - \left( \left( \frac {1} {2} \right) \frac {x^{2}} {2} + \left( \frac {1 \cdot 3} {2 \cdot 4} \right) \frac {x^{4}} {4} + \left( \frac {1 \cdot 3 \cdot 5} {2 \cdot 4 \cdot 6} \right) \frac {x^{6}} {6} +\cdots \right) \\
& = \ln \frac{2}{x} - \sum_{n=1}^\infty \left( \frac {(2n)!} {2^{2n}(n!)^2} \right) \frac {x^{2n}} {2n} , \qquad 0 < x \le 1 \end{align}$$

$$\begin{align}\operatorname{arcoth} x = \operatorname{artanh} \frac1x & = x^{-1} + \frac {x^{-3}} {3} + \frac {x^{-5}} {5} + \frac {x^{-7}} {7} +\cdots \\
& = \sum_{n=0}^\infty \frac {x^{-(2n+1)}} {2n+1} , \qquad \left| x \right| > 1 \end{align}$$
An asymptotic expansion for arsinh is given by

$$\operatorname{arsinh} x = \ln(2x) + \sum\limits_{n = 1}^\infty  {\left( { - 1} \right)^{n - 1} \frac{{\left( {2n - 1} \right)!!}}{{2n\left( {2n} \right)!!}}} \frac{1}{{x^{2n} }}$$

== Principal values in the complex plane ==
As functions of a complex variable, inverse hyperbolic functions are multivalued functions that are analytic except at a finite number of points. For such a function, it is common to define a principal value, which is a single valued analytic function which coincides with one specific branch of the multivalued function, over a domain consisting of the complex plane in which a finite number of arcs (usually half lines or line segments) have been removed. These arcs are called branch cuts. The principal value of the multifunction is chosen at a particular point and values elsewhere in the domain of definition are defined to agree with those found by analytic continuation.

For example, for the square root, the principal value is defined as the square root that has a positive real part. This defines a single valued analytic function, which is defined everywhere, except for non-positive real values of the variables (where the two square roots have a zero real part). This principal value of the square root function is denoted $\sqrt x$ in what follows. Similarly, the principal value of the logarithm, denoted $\operatorname{Log}$ in what follows, is defined as the value for which the imaginary part has the smallest absolute value. It is defined everywhere except for non-positive real values of the variable, for which two different values of the logarithm reach the minimum.

For all inverse hyperbolic functions, the principal value may be defined in terms of principal values of the square root and the logarithm function. However, in some cases, the formulas of § Definitions in terms of logarithms do not give a correct principal value, as giving a domain of definition which is too small and, in one case non-connected.

=== Principal value of the inverse hyperbolic sine ===
The principal value of the inverse hyperbolic sine is given by
$$\operatorname{arsinh} z = \operatorname{Log}(z + \sqrt{z^2 + 1} \,)\,.$$

The argument of the square root is a non-positive real number, if and only if z belongs to one of the intervals [i, +i∞) and (−i∞, −i] of the imaginary axis. If the argument of the logarithm is real, then it is positive. Thus this formula defines a principal value for arsinh, with branch cuts [i, +i∞) and (−i∞, −i]. This is optimal, as the branch cuts must connect the singular points i and −i to infinity.

=== Principal value of the inverse hyperbolic cosine ===
The formula for the inverse hyperbolic cosine given in § Inverse hyperbolic cosine is not convenient, since similar to the principal values of the logarithm and the square root, the principal value of arcosh would not be defined for imaginary z. Thus the square root has to be factorized, leading to
$$\operatorname{arcosh}  z = \operatorname{Log}(z + \sqrt{z+1} \sqrt{z-1} \,)\,.$$

The principal values of the square roots are both defined, except if z belongs to the real interval (−∞, 1]. If the argument of the logarithm is real, then z is real and has the same sign. Thus, the above formula defines a principal value of arcosh outside the real interval (−∞, 1], which is thus the unique branch cut.

=== Principal values of the inverse hyperbolic tangent and cotangent ===
The formulas given in § Definitions in terms of logarithms suggests
$$\begin{align}
\operatorname{artanh} z  &=\frac12\operatorname{Log}\left(\frac{1+z}{1-z}\right)
\\
\operatorname{arcoth} z &=  \frac12\operatorname{Log}\left(\frac{z+1}{z-1}\right)
\end{align}$$
for the definition of the principal values of the inverse hyperbolic tangent and cotangent. In these formulas, the argument of the logarithm is real if and only if z is real. For artanh, this argument is in the real interval (−∞, 0], if z belongs either to (−∞, −1] or to [1, ∞). For arcoth, the argument of the logarithm is in (−∞, 0], if and only if z belongs to the real interval [−1, 1].

Therefore, these formulas define convenient principal values, for which the branch cuts are (−∞, −1] and [1, ∞) for the inverse hyperbolic tangent, and [−1, 1] for the inverse hyperbolic cotangent.

In view of a better numerical evaluation near the branch cuts, some authors use the following definitions of the principal values, although the second one introduces a removable singularity at z = 0. The two definitions of $\operatorname {artanh}$ differ for real values of z with z > 1. The ones of $\operatorname {arcoth}$ differ for real values of z with z ∈ [0, 1).
$$\begin{align}
\operatorname{artanh} z &= \tfrac12\operatorname{Log}\left({1+z}\right) -  \tfrac12\operatorname{Log}\left({1-z}\right)
\\
\operatorname{arcoth} z &= \tfrac12\operatorname{Log}\left({1+\frac{1}{z} }\right) -   \tfrac12\operatorname{Log}\left({1-\frac{1}{z}}\right)
\end{align}$$

=== Principal value of the inverse hyperbolic cosecant ===
For the inverse hyperbolic cosecant, the principal value is defined as
$$\operatorname{arcsch} z = \operatorname{Log}\left( \frac{1}{z} + \sqrt{ \frac{1}{z^2} +1 } \,\right).$$

It is defined except when the arguments of the logarithm and the square root are non-positive real numbers. The principal value of the square root is thus defined outside the interval [−i, i] of the imaginary line. If the argument of the logarithm is real, then z is a non-zero real number, and this implies that the argument of the logarithm is positive.

Thus, the principal value is defined by the above formula outside the branch cut, consisting of the interval [−i, i] of the imaginary line.

(At z = 0, there is a singular point that is included in the branch cut.)

=== Principal value of the inverse hyperbolic secant ===
Here, as in the case of the inverse hyperbolic cosine, we have to factorize the square root. This gives the principal value
$$\operatorname{arsech} z = \operatorname{Log}\left( \frac{1}{z} + \sqrt{ \frac{1}{z} + 1 } \, \sqrt{ \frac{1}{z} -1 } \right).$$

If the argument of a square root is real, then z is real, and it follows that both principal values of square roots are defined, except if z is real and belongs to one of the intervals (−∞, 0] and [1, +∞). If the argument of the logarithm is real and negative, then z is also real and negative. It follows that the principal value of arsech is well defined, by the above formula outside two branch cuts, the real intervals (−∞, 0] and [1, +∞).

For z = 0, there is a singular point that is included in one of the branch cuts.

=== Graphical representation ===
In the following graphical representation of the principal values of the inverse hyperbolic functions, the branch cuts appear as discontinuities of the color. The fact that the whole branch cuts appear as discontinuities, shows that these principal values may not be extended into analytic functions defined over larger domains. In other words, the above defined branch cuts are minimal.

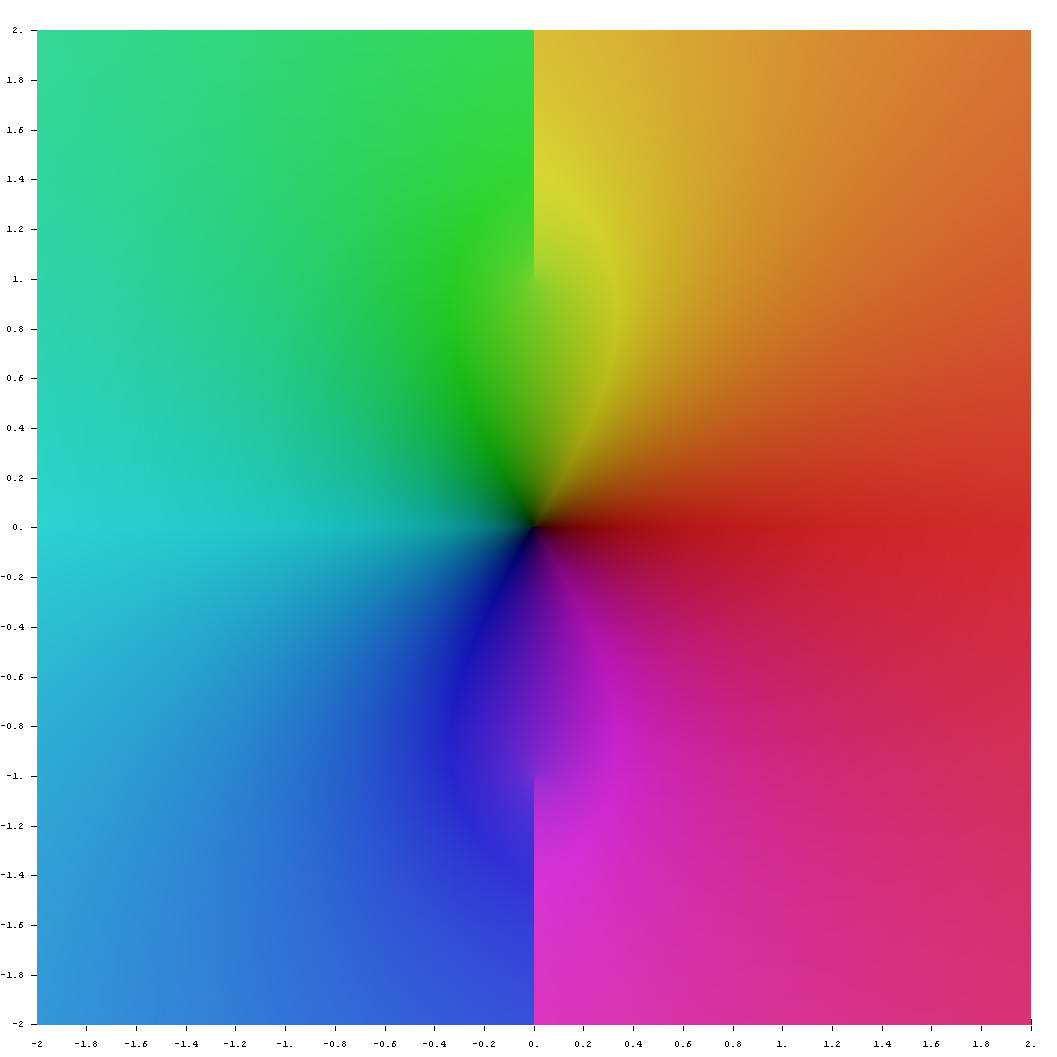
arsinh(z)

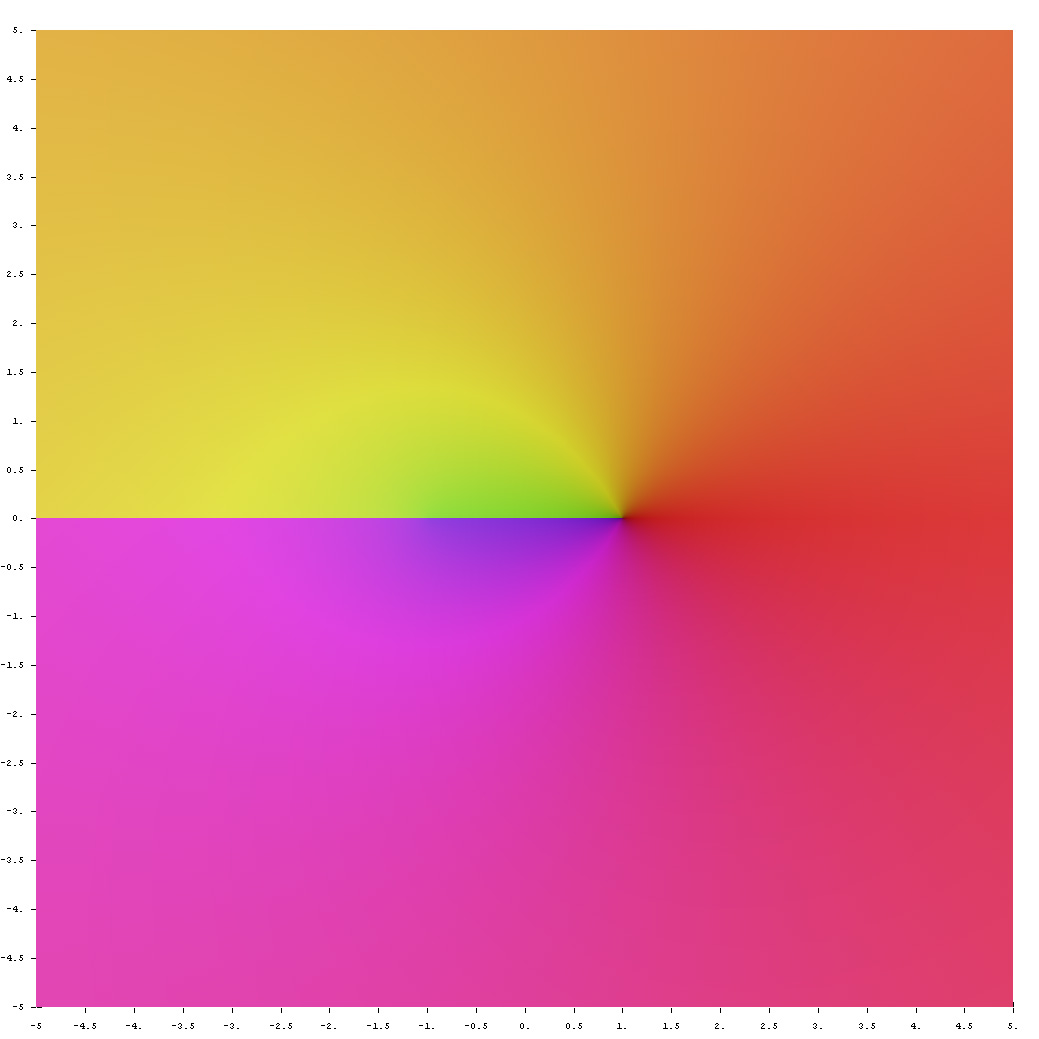
arcosh(z)

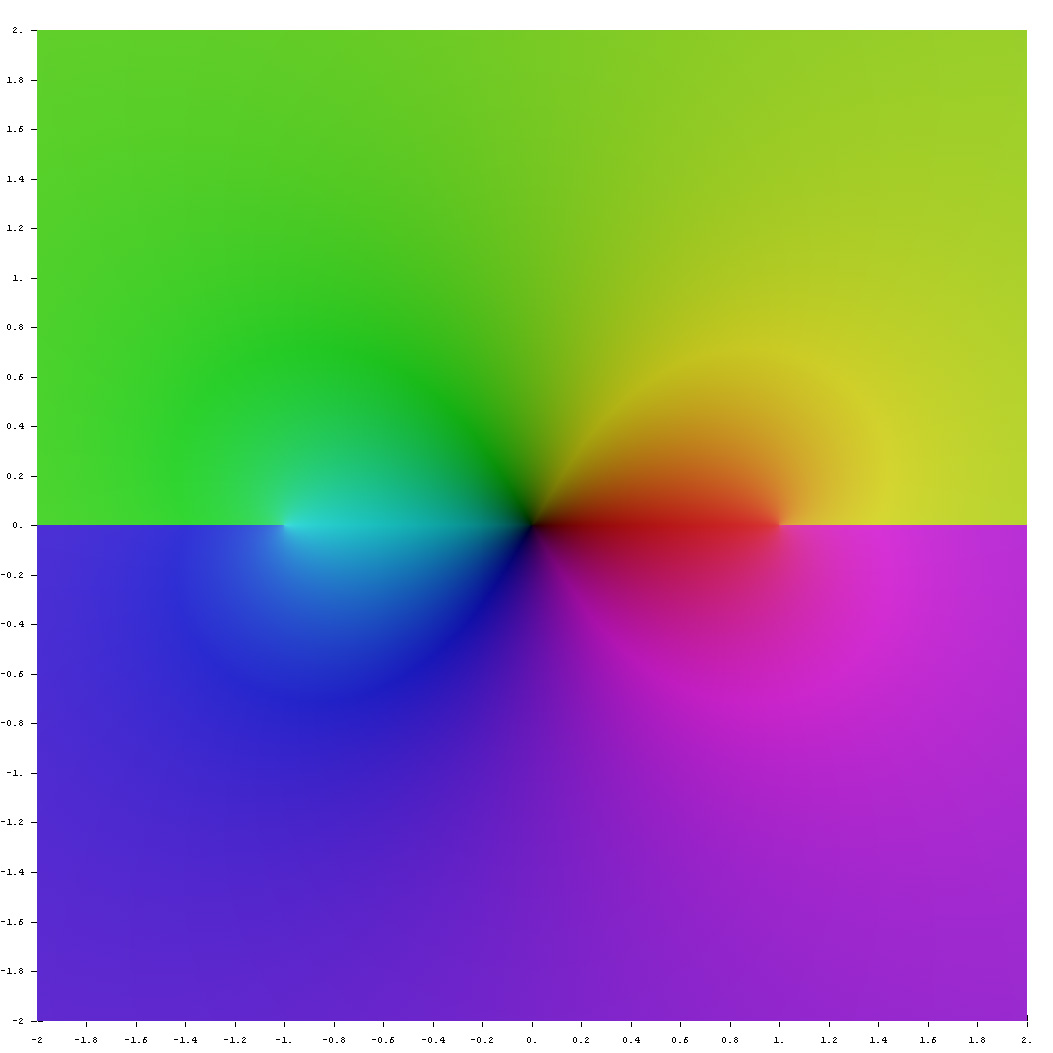
artanh(z)

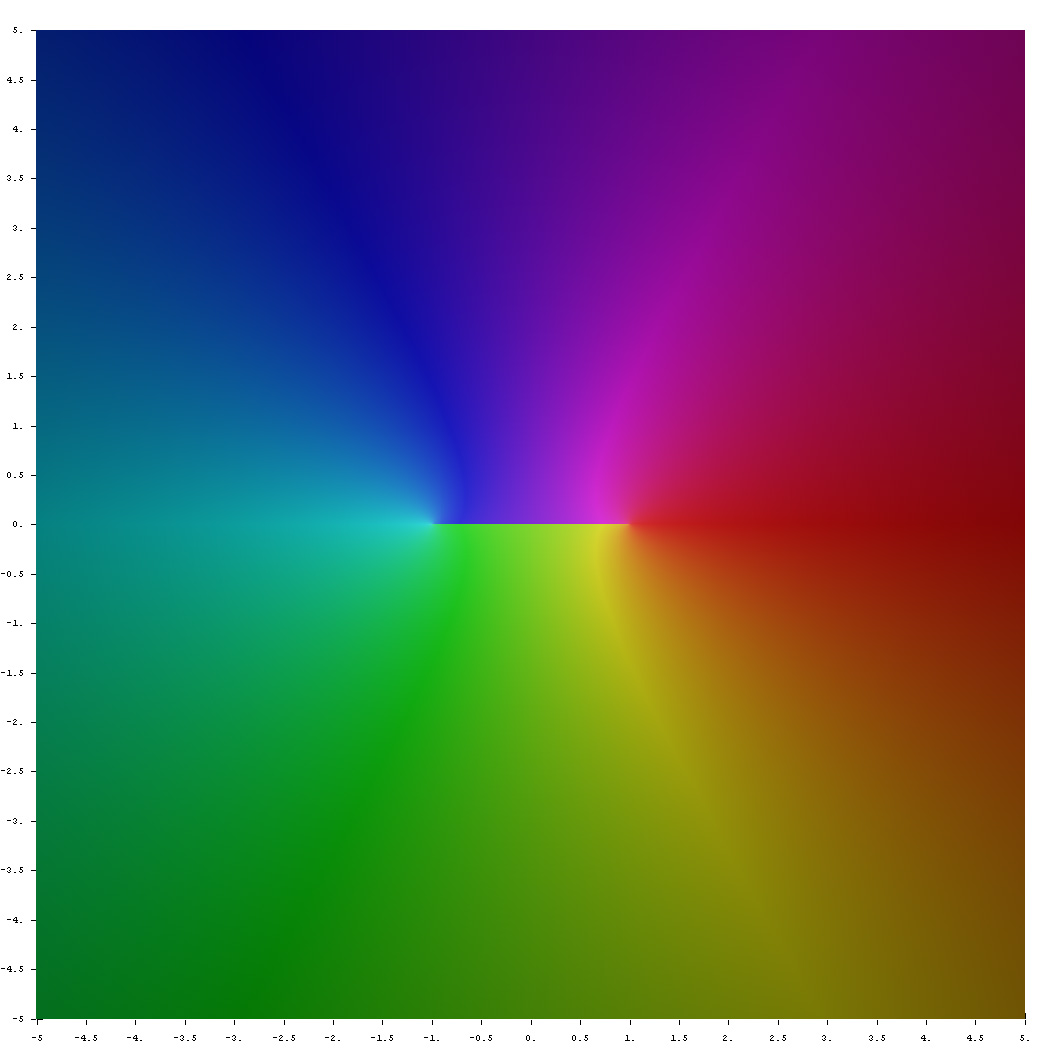
arcoth(z)

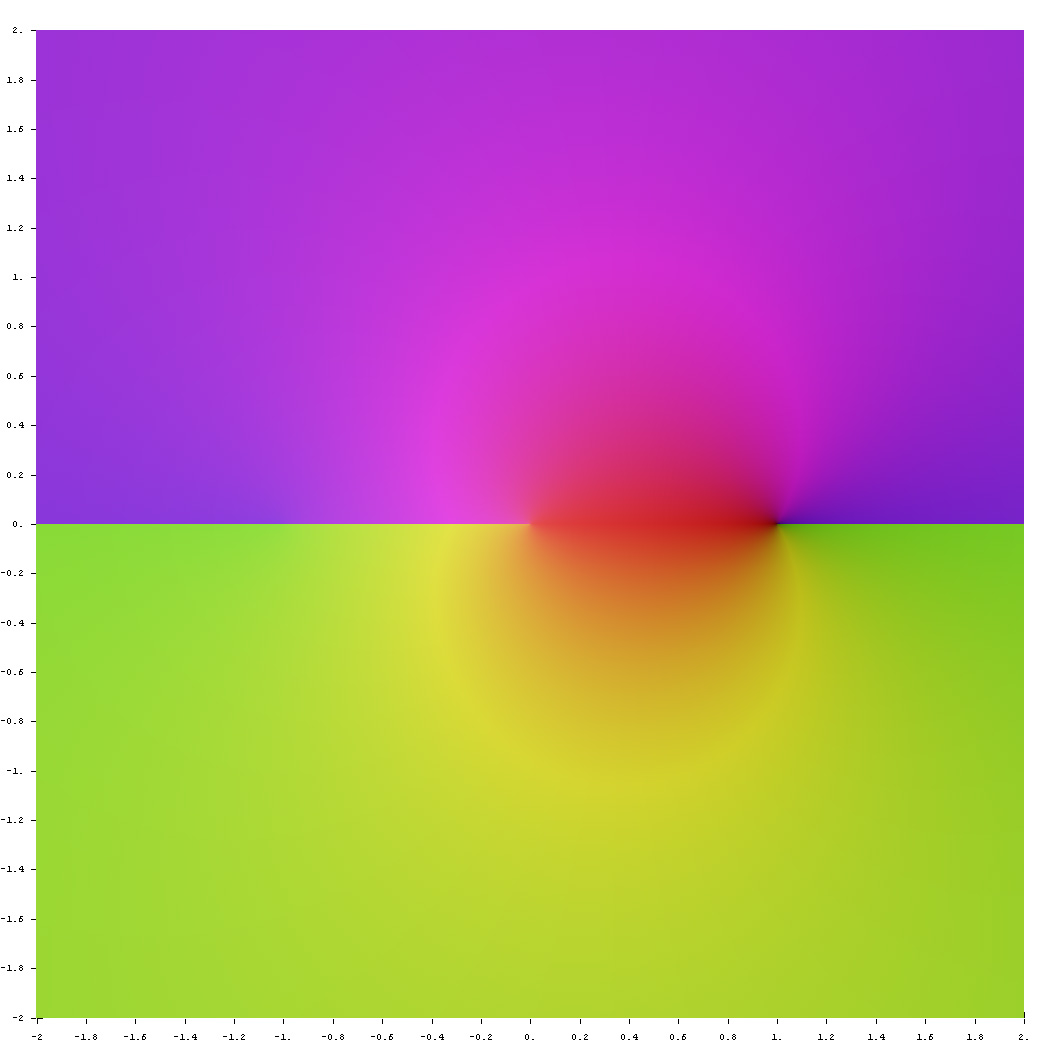
arsech(z)

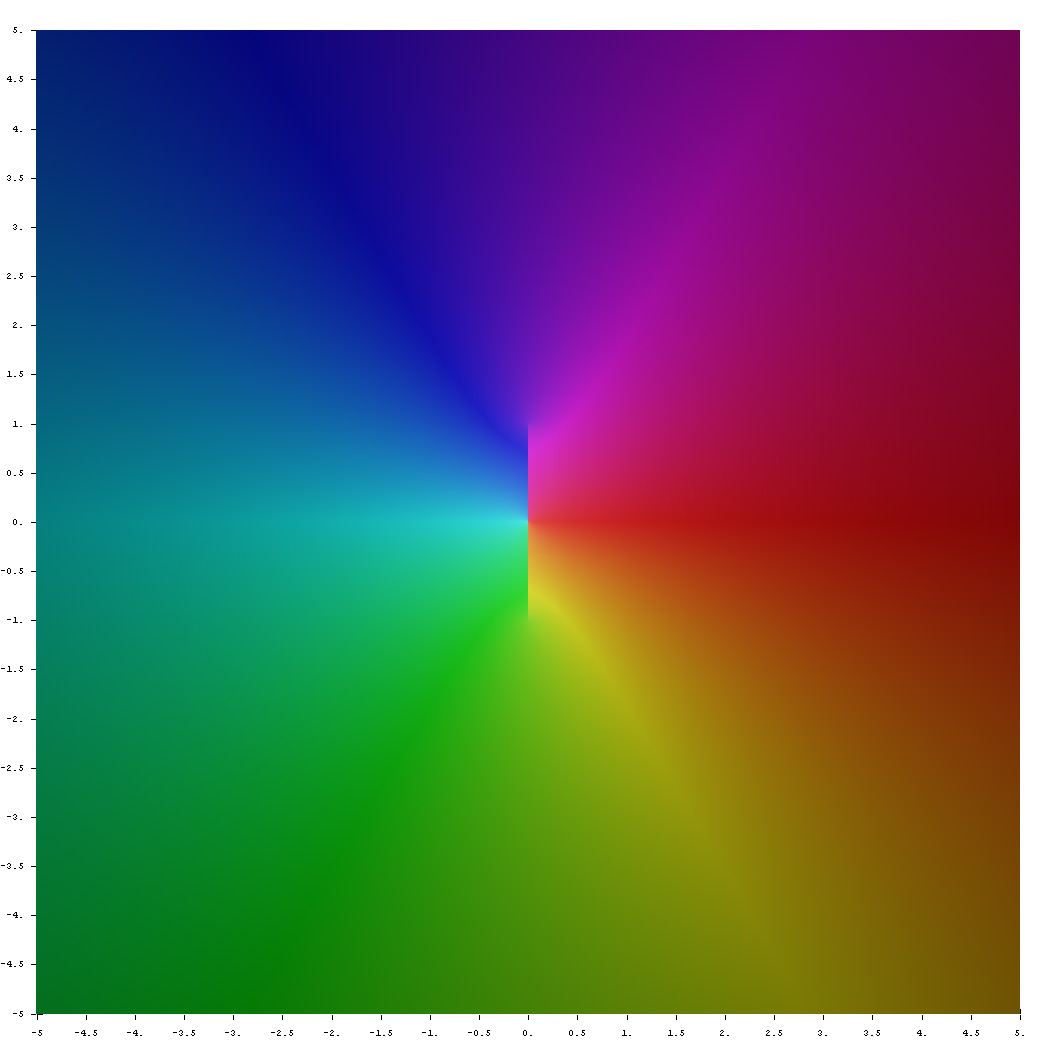
arcsch(z)

Inverse hyperbolic functions in the complex z-plane: the colour at each point in the plane represents the complex value of the respective function at that point

== See also ==
- Complex logarithm
- Hyperbolic secant distribution
- ISO 80000-2
- List of integrals of inverse hyperbolic functions

== Bibliography ==
- Herbert Busemann and Paul J. Kelly (1953) Projective Geometry and Projective Metrics, page 207, Academic Press.
