= Resource fragmentation hypothesis =

The resource fragmentation hypothesis was first proposed by Janzen & Pond (1975), and says that as species richness becomes large there is not a linear increase in the number of parasitoid species that can be supported. The mechanism for this hyperbolic relationship is suggested to be that each of the new host species is too rare to support the evolution of specialist parasitoids (Janzen & Pond, 1975). The resource fragmentation hypothesis is one of two hypotheses that seeks to explain the distribution of the Ichneumonidae.
