= Area function =

Area function may refer to:

- Inverse hyperbolic function
- Antiderivative
- The function for determining the area of a plane figure
