= Oriented area =

Oriented area may be either of:

- Vector area
- Signed area
