= Signed area =

Area interpreted positively or negatively

In mathematics, the signed area or oriented area of a region of an affine plane is its area with orientation specified by the positive or negative sign, that is "plus" ($+$) or "minus" ($-$). More generally, the signed area of an arbitrary surface region is its surface area with specified orientation. When the boundary of the region is a simple curve, the signed area also indicates the orientation of the boundary.

== Planar area ==
=== Polygons ===
The mathematics of ancient Mesopotamia, Egypt, and Greece had no explicit concept of negative numbers or signed areas, but had notions of shapes contained by some boundary lines or curves, whose areas could be computed or compared by pasting shapes together or cutting portions away, amounting to addition or subtraction of areas. This was formalized in Book I of Euclid's Elements, which leads with several common notions including "if equals are added to equals, then the wholes are equal" and "if equals are subtracted from equals, then the remainders are equal" (among planar shapes, those of the same area were called "equal"). The propositions in Book I concern the properties of triangles and parallelograms, including for example that parallelograms with the same base and in the same parallels are equal and that any triangle with the same base and in the same parallels has half the area of these parallelograms, and a construction for a parallelogram of the same area as any "rectilinear figure" (simple polygon) by splitting it into triangles. Greek geometers often compared planar areas by quadrature (constructing a square of the same area as the shape), and Book II of the Elements shows how to construct a square of the same area as any given polygon.

Just as negative numbers simplify the solution of algebraic equations by eliminating the need to flip signs in separately considered cases when a quantity might be negative, a concept of signed area analogously simplifies geometric computations and proofs. Instead of subtracting one area from another, two signed areas of opposite orientation can be added together, and the resulting area can be meaningfully interpreted regardless of its sign. For example, propositions II.12–13 of the Elements contain a geometric precursor of the law of cosines which is split into separate cases depending on whether the angle of a triangle under consideration is obtuse or acute, because a particular rectangle should either be added or subtracted, respectively (the cosine of the angle is either negative or positive). If the rectangle is allowed to have signed area, both cases can be collapsed into one, with a single proof (additionally covering the right-angled case where the rectangle vanishes).

As with the unoriented area of simple polygons in the Elements, the oriented area of polygons in the affine plane (including those with holes or self-intersections) can be conveniently reduced to sums of oriented areas of triangles, each of which in turn is half of the oriented area of a parallelogram. The oriented area of any polygon can be written as a signed real number coefficient (the signed area of the shape) times the oriented area of a designated polygon declared to have unit area; in the case of the Euclidean plane, this is typically a unit square.

Among the computationally simplest ways to break an arbitrary polygon (described by an ordered list of vertices) into triangles is to pick an arbitrary origin point, and then form the oriented triangle between the origin and each pair of adjacent vertices in the triangle. When the plane is given a Cartesian coordinate system, this method is the 18th century shoelace formula.

=== Curved shapes ===
The ancient Greeks had no general method for computing areas of shapes with curved boundaries, and the quadrature of the circle using only finitely many steps was an unsolved problem (proved impossible in the 19th century). However, Archimedes exactly computed the quadrature of the parabola via the method of exhaustion, summing infinitely many triangular areas in a precursor of modern integral calculus, and he approximated the quadrature of the circle by taking the first few steps of a similar process.

== Integrals ==
The blue area above the x-axis may be specified as positive area, while the yellow area below the x-axis is the negative area.

The integral of a real function can be imagined as the signed area between the $x$-axis and the curve $y = f(x)$ over an interval $[ a, b]$. The area above the $x$-axis may be specified as positive ($+$), and the area below the $x$-axis may be specified as negative ($-$).

The negative area arises in the study of natural logarithm as signed area below the curve $y = 1/x$ for $0 < x < 1$, that is:
$$\ln x = \int_1 ^x \frac{dt}{t} = - \int_x^1 \frac{dt}{t} < 0.$$

In differential geometry, the sign of the area of a region of a surface is associated with the orientation of the surface. The area of a region $A$ is obtained by integration of a differential 2-form:
$$\mu(A) = \int_A dx \wedge dy,$$
where $dx$ and $dy$ are the coordinate differential 1-forms. Since the wedge product has the anticommutative property, $dy \wedge dx = - dx \wedge dy$. The sign is associated with the planar orientation, something existing locally in a manifold but not necessarily globally. In the case of the natural logarithm, obtained by integrating the area under the hyperbola $xy = 1$, the form $dx \wedge dy$ is positive for $x > 1$, but since the integral
$$\int_1^x \frac{dt}{t}$$
is anchored to $1$, the orientation of the $x$-axis is reversed in the unit interval. For this integral, the opposite orientation yields the opposite sign to the one used for $t > 1$. With this opposite sign the area, under the hyperbola and above the unit interval, is taken as a negative area, and the natural logarithm consequently is negative in this domain.

== Determinants ==
Signed areas were associated with determinants by Felix Klein in 1908. When a triangle is specified by three points, its area is:
$$\frac{1}{2} \begin{vmatrix}x_1 & y_1 & 1 \\ x_2 & y_2 & 1 \\x_3 & y_3 & 1 \end{vmatrix}.$$
For instance, when $(x_3,\ y_3) = (0,0) ,$ then the area is given by $\frac{x_1 y_2 - x_2 y_1}{2}.$

To consider a sector area bounded by a curve, it is approximated by thin triangles with one side equipollent to $(dx, dy)$ which have an area
$$\frac{1}{2} \begin{vmatrix} 0 & 0 & 1 \\ x & y & 1 \\ x+dx & y+dy & 1 \end{vmatrix} = \frac{1}{2} (x\ dy - y\ dx).$$
Then the "area of the sector between the curve and two radius vectors" is given by
$$\frac{1}{2} \int_1 ^2 (x\ dy - y\ dx).$$
For example, the reverse orientation of the unit hyperbola is given by $x = \cosh t, ~ y = -\sinh t .$ Then
$$x \ dy - y \ dx = - \cosh^2 t \ dt + \sinh^2 t \ dt = - dt ,$$
so the area of the hyperbolic sector between $0$ and $\theta$ is
$$\frac{-1}{2} \int_0^\theta dt = \left. \frac{-t}{2} \right|_0^\theta = -\frac{\theta}{2},$$
giving a negative hyperbolic angle as a negative sector area.

== Postnikov equivalence ==
Mikhail Postnikov's 1979 textbook Lectures in Geometry appeals to certain geometric transformations – described as functions of coordinate pairs $(x, y)$ – to express "freely floating area elements". A shear mapping is either of:
$$\begin{align}
(x,y) &\to (x,\ y + kx), \\
(x,y) &\to (x + ky,\ y)
\end{align}$$
for any real number $k$, while a squeeze mapping is
$$(x,y) \to (\lambda x,\ y/\lambda)$$
for any positive real number $\lambda$. An area element is related ($\thicksim$) to another if one of the transformations results in the second when applied to the first. As an equivalence relation, the area elements are segmented into equivalence classes of related elements, which are Postnikov bivectors.

Proposition: If $(a_1, b_1) = (ka + \ell b, \ k_1 a + \ \ell_1 b)$ and

$\delta = k \ell_1 - \ell k_1 \ne 0 ,$ then $(a, b) \thicksim (a_1, \ (\frac{1}{\delta}) b_1) .$

proof: $(a,\ b) \thicksim (a + \frac{\ell}{k} b, \ b)$ shear mapping
$\thicksim (ka + \ell b, \ \tfrac{1}{k} b)$ squeeze mapping
$\thicksim (ka + \ell b, \ \tfrac{1}{k} b + \frac{k_1}{k \delta} (ka + \ell b) )$ shear mapping
$$= (ka + \ell b, \ \frac{k_1}{k \delta} (ka + (\frac{\delta}{k_1} + \ell) b)$$
$$= (ka + \ell b, \ \frac{1}{\delta} (k_1a + \ell_1 b) ) \ \ \text{since}\ \ \ell + \frac{\delta}{k_1} = \frac{k}{k_1} \ell_1$$
$$= (a_1, \ \frac{1}{\delta} b_1) .$$

== See also ==
- Vector area
- Volume form
- Signed distance
- Signed measure
- Signed volume
