= George Osborn (mathematician) =

English mathematician (1864–1932)

- Born: 1864; Manchester, England
- Died: October 1932 (aged 67–68)
- Education: Emmanuel College, Cambridge
- Occupation: Mathematician
- Employer: The Leys School
- Known for: Osborn’s rule that deals with Hyperbolic Trigonometric identities
- Relatives: George Osborn (grandfather)

George Osborn (1864–1932) was an English mathematician, known for Osborn’s rule that deals with hyperbolic trigonometric identities.

== Life ==
Osborn was born in 1864 in Manchester, England and attended Emmanuel College, Cambridge University in 1884 where in 1887 he received the 17th Wrangler award for achieving a first in his mathematics degree. After this he then attended The Leys School, Cambridge in 1888 before becoming assistant headmaster and senior science master in 1891. He continued to work at the school until his retirement in 1926. Alongside his work in mathematics, Osborn took his time to study the New Testament owing to his grandfather Revenant George Osborn, the president of the Methodist Conference in 1863 and 1881. In addition to this, Osborn enjoyed reading Spanish literature and was an avid chess player up until his death on October 14, 1932.

== Work ==
From 1902 to 1925, Osborn wrote numerous articles for The Mathematical Gazette which covered a range of topics from sums of cubes to series expansions with his most notable paper in July 1902 titled: Mnemonic for hyperbolic formulae. In this publication Osborn outlined a rule, that he found useful for teaching, when converting between trigonometric and hyperbolic trigonometric identities. In conjunction with this he published various books with his colleague Charles Henry French, who was the head of mathematics at The Leys School, Cambridge. The titles of their joint work include: Elementary Algebra, First Year’s Algebra and The Graphical Representation of Algebraic Functions.

== Osborn's Rule ==
Osborn’s Rule which was outlined in his 1902 Mathematical Gazette publication: Mnemonic for hyperbolic formulae and aids in the conversion between trigonometric and hyperbolic trigonometric identities. To convert a trigonometric identity to the equivalent hyperbolic trigonometric identity, Osborn’s rule states to first write out all the cosine and sine compound angles terms to their expanded constituent parts. Then exchange all the cosine and sine terms to cosh and sinh terms. However, for all products or implied products of two sine terms replace it with the negative product of two sinh terms. This is because $-i\sin(ix)$ is equivalent to $\sinh(x)$, so when multiplied together the sign switched when compared to the regular trigonometric identity. Due to this fact however, for terms which have a product of a multiple of four sinh terms the sign does not change when compared to the regular trigonometric identities.

Example identities
Trigonometric identity	Hyperbolic trigonometric identity
$\cos^2(x)+\sin^2(x)=1$	$\cosh^2(x)-\sinh^2(x)=1$
$1+\tan^2(x)=\sec^2(x)$	$1-\tanh^2(x)=\operatorname{sech^2}(x)$
$\cot^2(x)+1=\csc^2(x)$	$-\coth^2(x)+1=-\operatorname{csch^2}(x)$
$\cos(x+y)=\cos(x)\cos(y)-\sin(x)\sin(y)$	$\cosh(x+y)=\cosh(x)\cosh(y)+\sinh(x)\sinh(y)$
$\cos(2x)=1-2\sin^2(x)$	$\cosh(2x)=1+2\sinh^2(x)$
