= Hyperbolic sector =

Region of the Cartesian plane bounded by a hyperbola and two radii

A hyperbolic sector is a region of the Cartesian plane bounded by a hyperbola and two rays from the origin to it. For example, the two points (a, 1/a) and (b, 1/b) on the rectangular hyperbola xy = 1, or the corresponding region when this hyperbola is re-scaled and its orientation is altered by a rotation leaving the center at the origin, as with the unit hyperbola. A hyperbolic sector in standard position has a = 1 and b > 1.

The signed area of the hyperbolic sector is used to define the hyperbolic angle, which is analogous to how the area of a circular sector defines a circular angle.
In other words, the hyperbolic angle is the argument of hyperbolic functions in the same way that the circular angle is the argument of circular functions.

== Hyperbolic triangle ==
Hyperbolic triangle (yellow) and hyperbolic sector (red) corresponding to hyperbolic angle u, to the rectangular hyperbola (equation y = 1/x). The legs of the triangle are √2 times the hyperbolic cosine and sine functions.

When in standard position, a hyperbolic sector determines a hyperbolic triangle, the right triangle with one vertex at the origin, base on the diagonal ray y = x, and third vertex on the hyperbola

$$xy=1,\,$$

with the hypotenuse being the segment from the origin to the point (x, y) on the hyperbola. The length of the base of this triangle is

$$\sqrt 2 \cosh u,\,$$

and the altitude is

$$\sqrt 2 \sinh u,\,$$

where u is the appropriate hyperbolic angle. The usual definitions of the hyperbolic functions can be seen via the legs of right triangles plotted with hyperbolic coordinates. When the length of these legs is divided by the square root of 2, they can be graphed as the unit hyperbola with hyperbolic cosine and sine coordinates.

The analogy between circular and hyperbolic functions was described by Augustus De Morgan in his Trigonometry and Double Algebra (1849). William Burnside used such triangles, projecting from a point on the hyperbola xy = 1 onto the main diagonal, in his article "Note on the addition theorem for hyperbolic functions".

== Hyperbolic logarithm ==
The hyperbolic sector POQ area is equal to logarithm evaluated between S and R.

It is known that f(x) = x^{p} has an algebraic antiderivative except in the case p = –1 corresponding to the quadrature of the hyperbola. The other cases are given by Cavalieri's quadrature formula. Whereas quadrature of the parabola had been accomplished by Archimedes in the third century BC (in The Quadrature of the Parabola), the hyperbolic quadrature required the invention in 1647 of a new function: Gregoire de Saint-Vincent addressed the problem of computing the areas bounded by a hyperbola. His findings led to the natural logarithm function, once called the hyperbolic logarithm since it is obtained by integrating, or finding the area, under the hyperbola.

Before 1748 and the publication of Introduction to the Analysis of the Infinite, the natural logarithm was known in terms of the area of a hyperbolic sector. Leonhard Euler changed that when he introduced transcendental functions such as 10^{x}. Euler identified e as the value of b producing a unit of area (under the hyperbola or in a hyperbolic sector in standard position). Then the natural logarithm could be recognized as the inverse function to the transcendental exponential function e^{x}.

Proposition: Given 0 < a < b and P = (a, 1/a), Q = (b, 1/b), the signed area of the hyperbolic sector POQ is log b/a.

proof: In the figure, POQ = POS + PQRS − QOR. Then the equality of areas POS and QOR implies area POQ = area PQRS = $\int_a^b \frac{dx}{x} = \log b - \log a = \log \frac{b}{a}$.

In particular, for a hyperbolic sector in standard position (a = 1), the area of the hyperbolic sector is log b.

=== Standard sector ===
Given a line of positive slope m > 0, y = mx, and the main diagonal (m = 1), the standard hyperbolic sector is limited by xy = 1, a standard rectangular hyperbola. The variable line intersects the hyperbola when 1/x = mx or x = m^{−1/2}.

Corollary: The area of the standard sector is $\log (m^{-1/2}) = - \frac{1}{2} \log m$.

The negative sign indicates orientation reversal for increasing logarithms and increasing slopes.

== Hyperbolic geometry ==
When Felix Klein's book on non-Euclidean geometry was published in 1928, it provided a foundation for the subject by reference to projective geometry. To establish hyperbolic measure on a line, Klein noted that the area of a hyperbolic sector provided visual illustration of the concept.

Hyperbolic sectors can also be drawn to the hyperbola $y = \sqrt{1 + x^2}$. The area of such hyperbolic sectors has been used to define hyperbolic distance in a geometry textbook.

== See also ==
- Squeeze mapping
