= Hyperbolic angle =

Argument of the hyperbolic functions

The curve represents xy = 1. A hyperbolic angle has magnitude equal to the area of the corresponding hyperbolic sector, which is in standard position if a = 1

In geometry, hyperbolic angle is a real number determined by the area of the corresponding hyperbolic sector of xy = 1 in Quadrant I of the Cartesian plane. Hyperbolic angle is a shuffled form of natural logarithm as they both are defined as an area against hyperbola xy = 1, and they both are preserved by squeeze mappings since those mappings preserve area.

The hyperbola xy = 1 is rectangular with semi-major axis $\sqrt 2$, analogous to the circular angle equaling the area of a circular sector in a circle with radius $\sqrt 2$.

Hyperbolic angle is used as the independent variable for the hyperbolic functions sinh, cosh, and tanh, because these functions may be premised on hyperbolic analogies to the corresponding circular (trigonometric) functions by regarding a hyperbolic angle as defining a hyperbolic triangle. The hyperbolic angle parametrizes the unit hyperbola, which has hyperbolic functions as coordinates.

== Definition ==
POQ = POS + PQRS − QOR. Equality of areas POS and QOR implies area POQ = area PQRS = $\int_S^R \frac{dx}{x} = \ln R - \ln S = ln \frac{R}{S}$.

Consider the rectangular hyperbola $\textstyle\{(x,\frac 1 x): x>0\}$, and (by convention) pay particular attention to the part with $x > 1$.

First define:

- The hyperbolic angle in standard position is the angle at $(0, 0)$ between the ray to $(1, 1)$ and the ray to $\textstyle(x, \frac 1 x)$, where $x > 1$.
- The magnitude of this angle is the signed area of the corresponding hyperbolic sector, which turns out to be $\operatorname{ln}x$.

Note that by properties of natural logarithm:

- Unlike circular angle, the hyperbolic angle is unbounded (because $\operatorname{ln}x$ is unbounded); this is related to the fact that the harmonic series is unbounded.
- The formula for the magnitude of the angle suggests that, for $0 < x < 1$, the hyperbolic angle should be negative. This reflects the fact that, as defined, the angle is directed.

Finally, extend the definition of hyperbolic angle to that subtended by any interval on the hyperbola. Suppose $a, b, c, d$ are positive real numbers such that $ab = cd = 1$ and $c > a > 1$, so that $(a, b)$ and $(c, d)$ are points on the hyperbola $xy=1$ and determine an interval on it. Then the squeeze mapping $\textstyle f:(x, y)\to(bx, ay)$ maps the angle $\angle\!\left ((a, b), (0,0), (c, d)\right)$ to the standard position angle $\angle\!\left ((1, 1), (0,0), (bc, ad)\right)$. By the result of Gregoire de Saint-Vincent, the hyperbolic sectors determined by these angles have the same area, which is taken to be the magnitude of the angle. This magnitude is $\operatorname{ln}{(bc)}=\operatorname{ln}(c/a) =\operatorname{ln}c-\operatorname{ln}a$.

== Comparison with circular angle ==
The unit hyperbola has a sector with an area half of the hyperbolic angle

Circular vs. hyperbolic angle

A unit circle $x^2 + y^2 = 1$ has a circular sector with an area half of the circular angle in radians. Analogously, a unit hyperbola $x^2 - y^2 = 1$ has a hyperbolic sector with an area half of the hyperbolic angle.

There is also a projective resolution between circular and hyperbolic cases: both curves are conic sections, and hence are treated as projective ranges in projective geometry. Given an origin point on one of these ranges, other points correspond to angles. The idea of addition of angles, basic to science, corresponds to addition of points on one of these ranges as follows:

Circular angles can be characterized geometrically by the property that if two chords P_{0}P_{1} and P_{0}P_{2} subtend angles L_{1} and L_{2} at the centre of a circle, their sum L_{1} + L_{2} is the angle subtended by a chord P_{0}Q, where P_{0}Q is required to be parallel to P_{1}P_{2}.

The same construction can also be applied to the hyperbola. If P_{0} is taken to be the point (1, 1), P_{1} the point (x_{1}, 1/x_{1}), and P_{2} the point (x_{2}, 1/x_{2}), then the parallel condition requires that Q be the point (x_{1}x_{2}, 1/x_{1}1/x_{2}). It thus makes sense to define the hyperbolic angle from P_{0} to an arbitrary point on the curve as a logarithmic function of the point's value of x.

Whereas in Euclidean geometry moving steadily in an orthogonal direction to a ray from the origin traces out a circle, in a pseudo-Euclidean plane steadily moving orthogonally to a ray from the origin traces out a hyperbola. In Euclidean space, the multiple of a given angle traces equal distances around a circle while it traces exponential distances upon the hyperbolic line.

Both circular and hyperbolic angle provide instances of an invariant measure. Arcs with an angular magnitude on a circle generate a measure on certain measurable sets on the circle whose magnitude does not vary as the circle turns or rotates. For the hyperbola the turning is by squeeze mapping, and the hyperbolic angle magnitudes stay the same when the plane is squeezed by a mapping

(x, y) ↦ (rx, y / r), with r > 0 .

=== Relation To The Minkowski Line Element ===
There is also a relation to a hyperbolic angle and the metric defined on Minkowski space. Just as two dimensional Euclidean geometry defines its line element as

$$ds_{e}^2 = dx^2 + dy^2,$$

the line element on Minkowski space is

$$ds_{m}^2 = dx^2 - dy^2.$$

Consider a curve embedded in two dimensional Euclidean space,

$$x = f(t), y=g(t).$$

Where the parameter $t$ is a real number that runs between $a$ and $b$ ($a\leqslant t<b$). The arclength of this curve in Euclidean space is computed as:

$$S = \int_{a}^{b}ds_{e} =  \int_{a}^{b} \sqrt{\left (\frac{dx}{dt}\right )^2 + \left (\frac{dy}{dt}\right )^2 }dt.$$

If $x^2 + y^2 = 1$ defines a unit circle, a single parameterized solution set to this equation is $x = \cos t$ and $y = \sin t$. Letting $0\leqslant t < \theta$, computing the arclength $S$ gives $S = \theta$. Now doing the same procedure, except replacing the Euclidean element with the Minkowski line element,

$$S = \int_{a}^{b}ds_{m} =  \int_{a}^{b} \sqrt{\left (\frac{dx}{dt}\right )^2 - \left (\frac{dy}{dt}\right )^2 }dt,$$

and defining a unit hyperbola as $y^2 - x^2 = 1$ with its corresponding parameterized solution set $y = \cosh t$ and $x = \sinh t$, and by letting $0\leqslant t < \eta$ (the hyperbolic angle), we arrive at the result of $S = \eta$. Just as the circular angle is the length of a circular arc using the Euclidean metric, the hyperbolic angle is the length of a hyperbolic arc using the Minkowski metric.

== History ==
The quadrature of the hyperbola is the evaluation of the area of a hyperbolic sector. It can be shown to be equal to the corresponding area against an asymptote. The quadrature was first accomplished by Gregoire de Saint-Vincent in 1647 in Opus geometricum quadrature circuli et sectionum coni. As expressed by a historian,

[He made the] quadrature of a hyperbola to its asymptotes, and showed that as the area increased in arithmetic series the abscissas increased in geometric series.

A. A. de Sarasa interpreted the quadrature as a logarithm and thus the geometrically defined natural logarithm (or "hyperbolic logarithm") is understood as the area under y = 1/x to the right of x = 1. As an example of a transcendental function, the logarithm is more familiar than its motivator, the hyperbolic angle. Nevertheless, the hyperbolic angle plays a role when the theorem of Saint-Vincent is advanced with squeeze mapping.

Circular trigonometry was extended to the hyperbola by Augustus De Morgan in his textbook Trigonometry and Double Algebra. In 1878 W.K. Clifford used the hyperbolic angle to parametrize a unit hyperbola, describing it as "quasi-harmonic motion".

In 1894 Alexander Macfarlane circulated his essay "The Imaginary of Algebra", which used hyperbolic angles to generate hyperbolic versors, in his book Papers on Space Analysis. The following year Bulletin of the American Mathematical Society published Mellen W. Haskell's outline of the hyperbolic functions.

When Ludwik Silberstein penned his popular 1914 textbook on the new theory of relativity, he used the rapidity concept based on hyperbolic angle a, where tanh a = v/c, the ratio of velocity v to the speed of light. He wrote:

It seems worth mentioning that to unit rapidity corresponds a huge velocity, amounting to 3/4 of the velocity of light; more accurately we have v = (.7616)c for a = 1.
[...] the rapidity a = 1, [...] consequently will represent the velocity .76 c which is a little above the velocity of light in water.

Silberstein also uses Lobachevsky's concept of angle of parallelism Π(a) to obtain cos Π(a) = v/c.

== Imaginary circular angle ==
The hyperbolic angle is often presented as if it were an imaginary number, $\cos ix = \cosh x$ and $\sin ix = i \sinh x,$ so that the hyperbolic functions cosh and sinh can be presented through the circular functions. But in the Euclidean plane we might alternately consider circular angle measures to be imaginary and hyperbolic angle measures to be real scalars, $\cosh ix = \cos x$ and $\sinh ix = i \sin x.$

These relationships can be understood in terms of the exponential function, which for a complex argument $z$ can be broken into even and odd parts $\cosh z = \tfrac12(e^z + e^{-z})$ and $\sinh z = \tfrac12(e^z - e^{-z}),$ respectively. Then

$$e^z = \cosh z + \sinh z = \cos(iz) - i \sin(iz),$$

or if the argument is separated into real and imaginary parts $z = x + iy,$ the exponential can be split into the product of scaling $e^{x}$ and rotation $e^{iy},$

$$e^{x + iy} = e^{x}e^{iy} = (\cosh x + \sinh x)(\cos y + i \sin y).$$

As infinite series,

$$\begin{alignat}{3}
e^z      &= \,\,\sum_{k=0}^\infty \frac{z^k}{k!}  &&
= 1 + z + \tfrac{1}{2}z^2 + \tfrac16z^3 + \tfrac1{24}z^4 + \dots \\
\cosh z  &= \sum_{k \text{ even} } \frac{z^k}{k!} &&
= 1 + \tfrac{1}{2}z^2 + \tfrac1{24}z^4 + \dots \\
\sinh z  &= \,\sum_{k \text{ odd} } \frac{z^k}{k!} &&
= z + \tfrac{1}{6}z^3 + \tfrac1{120}z^5 + \dots \\
\cos z   &= \sum_{k \text{ even} } \frac{(iz)^k}{k!} &&
= 1 - \tfrac{1}{2}z^2 + \tfrac1{24}z^4 - \dots \\
i \sin z &= \,\sum_{k \text{ odd} } \frac{(iz)^k}{k!} &&
= i\left(z - \tfrac{1}{6}z^3 + \tfrac1{120}z^5 - \dots\right) \\
\end{alignat}$$

The infinite series for cosine is derived from cosh by turning it into an alternating series, and the series for sine comes from making sinh into an alternating series.

== Natural logarithm ==
The one-parameter group of squeeze mappings preserves areas.

The natural logarithm was first known as hyperbolic logarithm, which Gregorio a San Vincente posited as quadrature of a hyperbola in 1647. The particular hyperbola y = 1/x bounds hyperbolic sectors which have area that is the same after as before a squeeze mapping as shown in the animation.

A swapping in and out, of triangles of one-half unit area, shows the area of a hyperbolic sector is equal to the area of a region against an asymptote. The region represents the integral of 1/x over the segment on the asymptote. Its value depends only on the ratio of the ends of the interval. Standard usage has 1 at one end. If the second end x is less than 1, then

$$\ln x = \int_1^x \frac{dx}{x} = - \int_x^1 \frac{dx}{x} < 0 .$$

Leonhard Euler coined the phrase natural logarithm in 1748 after he found e (Euler’s number) as the number giving a unit of area. Then the exponential function e^{x} has the natural logarithm for its inverse.

== See also ==
- Transcendent angle
