= Squeeze mapping =

Linear map that preserves areas

A hyperbolic sector put in motion by a sequence of squeeze mappings with parameter a = 1.2214 (fifth root of e) and its reciprocal 0.81873

In linear algebra, a squeeze mapping, also called a squeeze transformation, is a type of linear map that preserves the Euclidean area of regions in the Cartesian plane, but is not a rotation or shear mapping.

For a fixed positive real number a, the mapping

$$(x, y) \mapsto (ax, y/a)$$

is the squeeze mapping with squeeze parameter a. Since

$$\{ (u,v) \, : \, u v = \mathrm{constant}\}$$

is a hyperbola, if u = ax and v = y/a, then uv = xy and the points of the image of the squeeze mapping are on the same hyperbola as (x,y) is. For this reason it is natural to think of the squeeze mapping as a hyperbolic rotation, as did Émile Borel in 1914, by analogy with circular rotations, which preserve circles.

== Logarithm and hyperbolic angle ==
POQ = POS + PQRS − QOR. Equality of areas POS and QOR implies area POQ = area PQRS = $\int_S^R \frac{dx}{x} = \log R - \log S = \log \frac{R}{S}$.

The squeeze mapping sets the stage for development of the concept of logarithms. The problem of finding the area bounded by a hyperbola (such as xy = 1) is one of quadrature. The solution, found by Grégoire de Saint-Vincent and Alphonse Antonio de Sarasa in 1647, required the natural logarithm function, a new concept. Some insight into logarithms comes through hyperbolic sectors that are permuted by squeeze mappings while preserving their area. The area of a hyperbolic sector is taken as a measure of a hyperbolic angle associated with the sector. The hyperbolic angle concept is quite independent of the ordinary circular angle, but shares a property of invariance with it: whereas circular angle is invariant under rotation, hyperbolic angle is invariant under squeeze mapping. Both circular and hyperbolic angle generate invariant measures but with respect to different transformation groups. The hyperbolic functions, which take hyperbolic angle as argument, perform the role that circular functions play with the circular angle argument.

== Group theory ==
A squeeze mapping moves one purple hyperbolic sector to another with the same area. It also squeezes blue and green rectangles.

In 1688, long before abstract group theory, the squeeze mapping was described by Euclid Speidell in the terms of the day: "From a Square and an infinite company of Oblongs on a Superficies, each Equal to that square, how a curve is begotten which shall have the same properties or affections of any Hyperbola inscribed within a Right Angled Cone."

If r and s are positive real numbers, the composition of their squeeze mappings is the squeeze mapping of their product. Therefore, the collection of squeeze mappings forms a one-parameter group isomorphic to the multiplicative group of positive real numbers. An additive view of this group arises from consideration of hyperbolic sectors and their hyperbolic angles.

From the point of view of the classical groups, the group of squeeze mappings is SO^{+}(1,1), the identity component of the indefinite orthogonal group of 2×2 real matrices preserving the quadratic form u^{2} − v^{2}. This is equivalent to preserving the form xy via the change of basis

$$x=u+v,\quad y=u-v\,,$$

and corresponds geometrically to preserving hyperbolae. The perspective of the group of squeeze mappings as hyperbolic rotation is analogous to interpreting the group SO(2) (the connected component of the definite orthogonal group) preserving quadratic form x^{2} + y^{2} as being circular rotations.

Note that the "SO^{+}" notation corresponds to the fact that the reflections

$$u \mapsto -u,\quad v \mapsto -v$$

are not allowed, though they preserve the form (in terms of x and y these are x ↦ y, y ↦ x and x ↦ −x, y ↦ −y); the additional "+" in the hyperbolic case (as compared with the circular case) is necessary to specify the identity component because the group O(1,1) has 4 connected components, while the group O(2) has 2 components: SO(1,1) has 2 components, while SO(2) only has 1. The fact that the squeeze transforms preserve area and orientation corresponds to the inclusion of subgroups SO ⊂ SL – in this case SO(1,1) ⊂ SL(2) – of the subgroup of hyperbolic rotations in the special linear group of transforms preserving area and orientation (a volume form). In the language of Möbius transformations, the squeeze transformations are the hyperbolic elements in the classification of elements.

A geometric transformation is called conformal when it preserves angles. Hyperbolic angle is defined using area under y = 1/x. Since squeeze mappings preserve areas of transformed regions such as hyperbolic sectors, the angle measure of sectors is preserved. Thus squeeze mappings are conformal in the sense of preserving hyperbolic angle.

== Applications ==
Here some applications are summarized with historic references.

=== Relativistic spacetime ===
Euclidean orthogonality is preserved by rotation in the left diagram; hyperbolic orthogonality with respect to hyperbola (B) is preserved by squeeze mapping in the right diagram.

Spacetime geometry is conventionally developed as follows: Select (0,0) for a "here and now" in a spacetime. Light radiant left and right through this central event tracks two lines in the spacetime, lines that can be used to give coordinates to events away from (0,0). Trajectories of lesser velocity track closer to the original timeline (0,t). Any such velocity can be viewed as a zero velocity under a squeeze mapping called a Lorentz boost. This insight follows from a study of split-complex number multiplications and the diagonal basis which corresponds to the pair of light lines. Formally, a squeeze preserves the hyperbolic metric expressed in the form xy; in a different coordinate system. This application in the theory of relativity was noted in 1912 by Wilson and Lewis, by Werner Greub, and by Louis Kauffman. Furthermore, the squeeze mapping form of Lorentz transformations was used by Gustav Herglotz (1909/10) while discussing Born rigidity, and was popularized by Wolfgang Rindler in his textbook on relativity, who used it in his demonstration of their characteristic property.

The term squeeze transformation was used in this context in an article connecting the Lorentz group with Jones calculus in optics.

=== Corner flow ===
In fluid dynamics one of the fundamental motions of an incompressible flow involves bifurcation of a flow running up against an immovable wall. Representing the wall by the axis y = 0 and taking the parameter r = exp(t) where t is time, then the squeeze mapping with parameter r applied to an initial fluid state produces a flow with bifurcation left and right of the axis x = 0. The same model gives fluid convergence when time is run backward. Indeed, the area of any hyperbolic sector is invariant under squeezing.

For another approach to a flow with hyperbolic streamlines, see Potential flow § Power laws with n = 2.

In 1989 Ottino described the "linear isochoric two-dimensional flow" as

$$v_1 = G x_2 \quad v_2 = K G x_1$$

where K lies in the interval [−1, 1]. The streamlines follow the curves

$$x_2^2 - K x_1^2 = \mathrm{constant}$$

so negative K corresponds to an ellipse and positive K to a hyperbola, with the rectangular case of the squeeze mapping corresponding to K = 1.

Stocker and Hosoi described their approach to corner flow as follows:

we suggest an alternative formulation to account for the corner-like geometry, based on the use of hyperbolic coordinates, which allows substantial analytical progress towards determination of the flow in a Plateau border and attached liquid threads. We consider a region of flow forming an angle of π/2 and delimited on the left and bottom by symmetry planes.

Stocker and Hosoi then recall Moffatt's consideration of "flow in a corner between rigid boundaries, induced by an arbitrary disturbance at a large distance." According to Stocker and Hosoi,

For a free fluid in a square corner, Moffatt's (antisymmetric) stream function ... [indicates] that hyperbolic coordinates are indeed the natural choice to describe these flows.

=== Bridge to transcendentals ===
The area-preserving property of squeeze mapping has an application in setting the foundation of the transcendental functions natural logarithm and its inverse the exponential function:

Definition: Sector(a,b) is the hyperbolic sector obtained with central rays to (a, 1/a) and (b, 1/b).

Lemma: If bc = ad, then there is a squeeze mapping that moves the sector(a,b) to sector(c,d).

Proof: Take parameter r = c/a so that (u,v) = (rx, y/r) takes (a, 1/a) to (c, 1/c) and (b, 1/b) to (d, 1/d).

Theorem (Gregoire de Saint-Vincent 1647) If bc = ad, then the quadrature of the hyperbola xy = 1 against the asymptote has equal areas between a and b compared to between c and d.

Proof: An argument adding and subtracting triangles of area 1/2, one triangle being {(0,0), (0,1), (1,1)}, shows the hyperbolic sector area is equal to the area along the asymptote. The theorem then follows from the lemma.

Theorem (Alphonse Antonio de Sarasa 1649) As area measured against the asymptote increases in arithmetic progression, the projections upon the asymptote increase in geometric sequence. Thus the areas form logarithms of the asymptote index.

For instance, for a standard position angle which runs from (1, 1) to (x, 1/x), one may ask "When is the hyperbolic angle equal to one?" The answer is the transcendental number x = e.

A squeeze with r = e moves the unit angle to one between (e, 1/e) and (ee, 1/ee) which subtends a sector also of area one. The geometric progression

e, e^{2}, e^{3}, ..., e^{n}, ...

corresponds to the asymptotic index achieved with each sum of areas

1,2,3, ..., n,...

which is a proto-typical arithmetic progression A + nd where A = 0 and d = 1 .

=== Lie transform ===
Following Pierre Ossian Bonnet's (1867) investigations on surfaces of constant curvatures, Sophus Lie (1879) found a way to derive new pseudospherical surfaces from a known one. Such surfaces satisfy the Sine-Gordon equation:

$$\frac{d^{2}\Theta}{ds\ d\sigma}=K\sin\Theta ,$$

where $(s,\sigma)$ are asymptotic coordinates of two principal tangent curves and $\Theta$ their respective angle. Lie showed that if $\Theta=f(s,\sigma)$ is a solution to the Sine-Gordon equation, then the following squeeze mapping (now known as Lie transform) indicates other solutions of that equation:

$$\Theta=f\left(ms,\ \frac{\sigma}{m}\right) .$$

Lie (1883) noticed its relation to two other transformations of pseudospherical surfaces: The Bäcklund transform (introduced by Albert Victor Bäcklund in 1883) can be seen as the combination of a Lie transform with a Bianchi transform (introduced by Luigi Bianchi in 1879.) Such transformations of pseudospherical surfaces were discussed in detail in the lectures on differential geometry by Gaston Darboux (1894), Luigi Bianchi (1894), or Luther Pfahler Eisenhart (1909).

It is known that the Lie transforms (or squeeze mappings) correspond to Lorentz boosts in terms of light-cone coordinates, as pointed out by Terng and Uhlenbeck (2000):

Sophus Lie observed that the SGE [Sinus-Gordon equation] is invariant under Lorentz transformations. In asymptotic coordinates, which correspond to light cone coordinates, a Lorentz transformation is $(x,t)\mapsto\left(\tfrac{1}{\lambda}x,\lambda t\right)$.

This can be represented as follows:

$$\begin{matrix}-c^{2}t^{2}+x^{2}=-c^{2}t^{\prime2}+x^{\prime2}\\
\hline \begin{align}ct' & =ct\gamma-x\beta\gamma &  & =ct\cosh\eta-x\sinh\eta\\
x' & =-ct\beta\gamma+x\gamma &  & =-ct\sinh\eta+x\cosh\eta
\end{align}
\\
\hline u=ct+x,\ v=ct-x,\ k=\sqrt{\tfrac{1+\beta}{1-\beta}}=e^{\eta}\\
u'=\frac{u}{k},\ v'=kv\\
\hline u'v'=uv
\end{matrix}$$

where k corresponds to the Doppler factor in Bondi k-calculus, η is the rapidity.

== See also ==
- Indefinite orthogonal group
- Isochoric process
