= Reigate Grammar School =

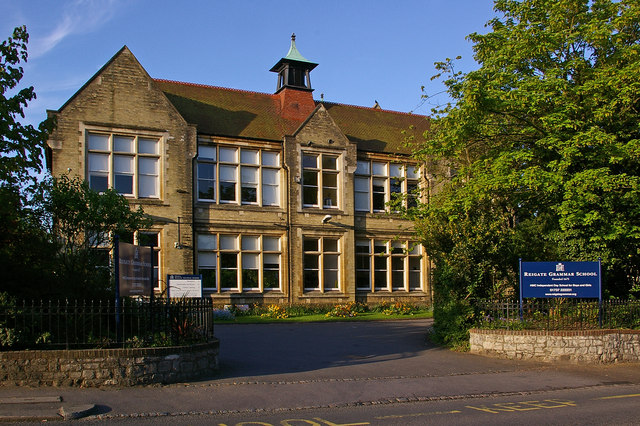

Location
- Reigate Road; Reigate, Surrey, RH2 0QS; England; 51.2373973°N 0.1955290°W

Information
- Type: Private day school Grammar school
- Established: 1675; 351 years ago
- Founder: Henry Smith
- Department for Education URN: 125422 Tables
- Headmaster: Shaun Fenton
- Staff: 120~
- Gender: Mixed
- Age range: 6–18
- Enrolment: 1,463 (2021)
- Capacity: 1,480
- Houses: Williamson; Cranston; Bird; Hodgson
- Colours: Blue and white
- School hymn: 'To Be a Pilgrim'
- Alumni: Old Reigatians
- School Fees: £27,795 to £28,545 per year
- Website: www.reigategrammar.org

Reigate Grammar School is an 11–18 co-educational private day school in Reigate, Surrey, England. It was established in 1675 and opened in 1684.

== History ==
=== Foundation ===
The school was founded in 1675 when a piece of land (forming part of the present site) was purchased in part with £150 bequeathed to Reigate by Henry Smith, the alderman of London, before his death in 1628. The purchase itself was made by Sir Edward Thurland of Great Doods, a judge of the Court of Exchequer. The school was initially founded for poor boys to study free of charge.

According to Hooper's history of Reigate, the school was not opened for teaching until 1684, when the vicar of Reigate, Rev. John Williamson, was appointed Master and the property conveyed to trustees. There was early controversy regarding the election of Williamson as master, ultimately resulting in the transfer of the school to a new set of trustees.

The school was not initially a grammar school, as the free scholars who attended were not instructed in Greek and Latin classics in the school's earliest days, focusing instead on The three Rs.

The school saw growth in the early eighteenth century, benefiting under the wills of two local residents, Robert Bishop and John Parker. The position of master was held by the parish vicar until 1728, with the three initial masters, John Williamson, Andrew Cranston and John Bird, now being the namesakes of school houses. The Rev. Joseph Hodgson, the fourth house namesake, did not become master until 1800. He was the wealthy curate of Leigh who served for over 40 years, resigning in June 1842.

=== Dilapidation and repair ===
By 1778, the school's premises were in such bad condition that churchwardens appealed to the vestry. The committee then appointed assessed that repairs would cost £70, and that future masters should keep the school in repair and teach four boys of the foundation.

By this date, the average number of day scholars was 30, of which ten were poor boys elected by two charities.

Between 1800 and 1802, the school was repaired by the overseers, costing £136 15s. 9d. provided by wills of Parker and Bishop.

=== Closure, 1859–1862 ===
Between 1859 and 1862, the school was closed following the death of Timothy Price. During this time, the Reigate Charities had been sanctioned by the Court of Chancery after an enquiry by the Charity Commission. The appointment of master was thereafter transferred to a new governing body. During the period of closure, the old buildings were demolished and replaced by new buildings. The school became a grammar school in 1862 when officially the Rev. John Gooch became its headmaster.

=== Modern history ===
From 1875, the school was under the control of a board of governors, four co-optative and ten elected by the borough council. After 1909, management was placed in the hands of a board of governors appointed by the borough council and Surrey Country Council. Under the Education Act 1944 it became a voluntary aided grammar school, providing access on the basis of academic ability as measured by the 11-Plus examination. In 1976, it converted to its current fee-paying independent status; pupils already studying there continued to not pay fees. At the same time the sixth form was opened up to girls. In 1993, the school became fully co-educational. In 2003, the school merged with a local prep school St. Mary's School. This is now called Reigate St Mary's Prep and Choir School and serves as the junior school, taking children from three to eleven, most of whom then proceed to the senior school.

== Reigate Grammar School International ==
Reigate Grammar School International was established in 2016 with the aim of establishing international schools under the Reigate Grammar School brand and ethos.

=== Reigate Grammar School Vietnam ===
Reigate Grammar School officially opened Reigate Grammar School Vietnam in April 2022, being the first UK independent school in the country. The school came to be following a joint venture and merger of the former International School of Vietnam, with the latter rebranding between 2020 and 2022. The school consists of a Preparatory school for Pre-K up to Year 6, a secondary school for Years 7 to 11, and its Sixth form, for years 12 to 13. Reigate Grammar School Vietnam is an IB world school and as such offers the PYP, the MYP, and the Diploma Program. The school is a Cambridge-accredited testing centre and as such a range of IGCSE programs are available.

Sixth-form students have the option of studying Cambridge International A-levels or the IBDP, with both programmes currently being taught on the main campus at Hoàng Mai. A planned separate campus is in the works exclusively for Sixth-form students undertaking A-levels in Hoàn Kiếm.

=== Other International schools ===
Reigate Grammar School has three international schools already open in China (Nanjing, Shenzhen, and Zhangjiagang), and one in Saudi Arabia (Riyadh), with partnerships with schools in Morocco and China.

== Facilities ==
The nearby Reigate St Mary's Preparatory School is owned by the RGS Foundation, which operates Reigate Grammar. The school has a separate sports facility named Hartstwood.

== Headmaster ==
Shaun Fenton, son of Alvin Stardust is the headmaster at Reigate Grammar school and executive headmaster of Reigate Grammar School Vietnam. He was previously headmaster at Pate's Grammar School and Sir John Lawes School. He is a member of the Headmasters' and Headmistresses' Conference.

=== International headmasters ===
Patrick Glennon is the current headmaster of Reigate Grammar School Vietnam

== Relationship with Dunottar School ==
In 2013 the school offered to give financial support to struggling local independent girls' school Dunottar School in Reigate, and in return Reigate Grammar School would help manage Dunottar. Then in late 2013 it was announced that Dunottar would be closed due to dwindling pupil numbers and poor finances. This caused uproar from the current Dunottar parents, who instead developed a plan to manage the school themselves. As a result the Reigate Grammar School relationship was not progressed and the parents had Dunottar school sign a 10-year contract with United Learning after negotiations.

== Notable former pupils ==
- Andrew Cantrill, organist
- Rich Cantrill, Commander Operations
- Norman Cook, or Fatboy Slim, musician
- Andrew Cooper, Conservative peer
- Vice Admiral Sir Geoffrey Dalton, Deputy Supreme Allied Commander Atlantic, later Secretary General of Mencap
- Ben Edwards, BBC Formula One racing commentator and former racing driver
- Bill Frindall, BBC cricket scorer
- Peter Fookes, British engineering geologist
- Peter Gershon, British businessman, civil servant and chairman of the National Grid plc
- Susan Gritton, singer
- John Haybittle, British Medical Physicist and co-inventor of the Haybittle–Peto boundary
- John Healey, Chancellor of the Exchequer, Member of Parliament for Rawmarsh and Conisbrough
- Anthony Hidden, high court judge
- Bevis Hillier, English art historian, author and journalist; hoaxer and scourge of A.N. Wilson, and Fellow of the Royal Society of Arts
- Godfrey Ince, civil servant
- Trevor Kavanagh, political editor of The Sun
- Peter Lampl, British philanthropist
- Ray Mears, TV presenter and survival expert
- Steve Mitchell (sailor), Star World Champion, and Olympian (GBR)
- John Murrell (chemist), British theoretical chemist who made important contributions to the understanding of the spectra of organic molecules, the theory of Intermolecular force and to the construction of Potential energy surface
- Andy Paul, CEO and owner of Corsair, a leading global developer and manufacturer of high-performance technology for gamers, content creators and PC enthusiasts.
- Romesh Ranganathan, British stand-up comedian and actor
- Alec Harley Reeves, electronics engineer, inventor of pulse-code modulation
- Keir Starmer, Prime Minister of the United Kingdom, Member of Parliament for Holborn and St Pancras
- Jeffrey Sterling, Conservative life peer and chairman of P&O
- Fred Streeter, horticulturalist and broadcaster
- Andrew Sullivan, journalist, blogger, and political commentator
- Derek Twine, charity CEO, who was Chief Scout Executive 1997-2013
- David Walliams, actor, writer and co-star of Little Britain
