= Sequential analysis =

Statistical analysis where the sample size is not fixed in advance

In statistics, sequential analysis or sequential hypothesis testing is statistical analysis where the sample size is not fixed in advance. Instead data is evaluated as it is collected, and further sampling is stopped in accordance with a pre-defined stopping rule as soon as significant results are observed. Thus a conclusion may sometimes be reached at a much earlier stage than would be possible with more classical hypothesis testing or estimation, at consequently lower financial and/or human cost.

== History ==
The method of sequential analysis is first attributed to Abraham Wald with Jacob Wolfowitz, W. Allen Wallis, and Milton Friedman while at Columbia University's Statistical Research Group as a tool for more efficient industrial quality control during World War II. Its value to the war effort was immediately recognised, and led to its receiving a "restricted" classification. At the same time, George Barnard led a group working on optimal stopping in Great Britain. Another early contribution to the method was made by K.J. Arrow with D. Blackwell and M.A. Girshick.

A similar approach was independently developed from first principles at about the same time by Alan Turing, as part of the Banburismus technique used at Bletchley Park, to test hypotheses about whether different messages coded by German Enigma machines should be connected and analysed together. This work remained secret until the early 1980s.

Peter Armitage introduced the use of sequential analysis in medical research, especially in the area of clinical trials. Sequential methods became increasingly popular in medicine following Stuart Pocock's work that provided clear recommendations on how to control Type 1 error rates in sequential designs.

== Alpha spending functions ==
When researchers repeatedly analyze data as more observations are added, the probability of a Type 1 error increases. Therefore, it is important to adjust the alpha level at each interim analysis, such that the overall Type 1 error rate remains at the desired level. This is conceptually similar to using the Bonferroni correction, but because the repeated looks at the data are dependent, more efficient corrections for the alpha level can be used. Among the earliest proposals is the Pocock boundary. Alternative ways to control the Type 1 error rate exist, such as the Haybittle–Peto bounds, and additional work on determining the boundaries for interim analyses has been done by O'Brien & Fleming and Wang & Tsiatis.

A limitation of corrections such as the Pocock boundary is that the number of looks at the data must be determined before the data is collected, and that the looks at the data should be equally spaced (e.g., after 50, 100, 150, and 200 patients). The alpha spending function approach developed by Demets & Lan does not have these restrictions, and depending on the parameters chosen for the spending function, can be very similar to Pocock boundaries or the corrections proposed by O'Brien and Fleming. Another approach that has no such restrictions at all is based on e-values and e-processes.

== Applications of sequential analysis ==
=== Clinical trials ===
In a randomized trial with two treatment groups, group sequential testing may for example be conducted in the following manner: After n subjects in each group are available an interim analysis is conducted. A statistical test is performed to compare the two groups and if the null hypothesis is rejected the trial is terminated; otherwise, the trial continues, another n subjects per group are recruited, and the statistical test is performed again, including all subjects. If the null is rejected, the trial is terminated, and otherwise it continues with periodic evaluations until a maximum number of interim analyses have been performed, at which point the last statistical test is conducted and the trial is discontinued.

=== Other applications ===
Sequential analysis also has a connection to the problem of gambler's ruin that has been studied by, among others, Huygens in 1657.

Step detection is the process of finding abrupt changes in the mean level of a time series or signal. It is usually considered as a special kind of statistical method known as change point detection. Often, the step is small and the time series is corrupted by some kind of noise, and this makes the problem challenging because the step may be hidden by the noise. Therefore, statistical and/or signal processing algorithms are often required. When the algorithms are run online as the data is coming in, especially with the aim of producing an alert, this is an application of sequential analysis.

== Bias ==
Trials that are terminated early because they reject the null hypothesis typically overestimate the true effect size. This is because in small samples, only large effect size estimates will lead to a significant effect, and the subsequent termination of a trial. Methods to correct effect size estimates in single trials have been proposed. Note that this bias is mainly problematic when interpreting single studies. In meta-analyses, overestimated effect sizes due to early stopping are balanced by underestimation in trials that stop late, leading Schou & Marschner to conclude that "early stopping of clinical trials is not a substantive source of bias in meta-analyses".

The meaning of p-values in sequential analyses also changes, because when using sequential analyses, more than one analysis is performed, and the typical definition of a p-value as the data “at least as extreme” as is observed needs to be redefined. One solution is to order the p-values of a series of sequential tests based on the time of stopping and how high the test statistic was at a given look, which is known as stagewise ordering, first proposed by Armitage.

== See also ==
- Optimal stopping
- Sequential estimation
- Sequential probability ratio test
- CUSUM
