= Anscombe =

Anscombe is a surname. Notable people with the surname include:

- Edmund Anscombe (1874–1948), New Zealand architect
- Frank Anscombe (1918–2001), British statistician
- G. E. M. Anscombe (1919–2001), British analytic philosopher
- Gareth Anscombe (born 1991), Wales rugby union player
- John Anscombe (1838–1881), English cricketer
- Mark Anscombe (born 1957), New Zealand rugby union coach
- Mike Anscombe, Canadian television news anchor
