= Cusum =

Cusum may refer to:

- CUSUM, a technique in statistical quality control
- Cusum (Pannonia), an ancient Roman city in today's Petrovaradin
