= Jayme Luiz Szwarcfiter =

Brazilian computer scientist

- Born: 5 July 1942; Rio de Janeiro, Brazil
- Education: Federal University of Rio de Janeiro
- Known for: Combinatorics; Graph theory
- Awards: Ordem Nacional do Mérito Científico
- Scientific career
- Fields: Computer science
- Workplaces: Federal University of Rio de Janeiro
- Doctoral advisor: Leslie Blackett Wilson

Jayme Luiz Szwarcfiter (born July 5, 1942, in Rio de Janeiro) is a computer scientist in Brazil.

== Biography ==
Szwarcfiter graduated in 1967 in electronic engineering from the Federal University of Rio de Janeiro (UFRJ). He received his MA in 1971 from COPPE. In 1975 he obtained his PhD in computer science from the University of Newcastle Upon Tyne, England, under supervision of Leslie Blackett Wilson. He is currently a professor emeritus at UFRJ. The Journal of the Brazilian Computer Society dedicated a special edition in 2001 to Szwarcfiter's major publications. Among others, he has written joint articles with Donald E. Knuth and Christos Papadimitriou.

== Awards ==
He received the Award of Scientific Merit from the Brazilian Computer Society in 2005. In April 2006 he won the Almirante Álvaro Alberto prize in computer science, one of the most important academic recognitions in Brazil. Szwarcfiter is also one of the recipients of the Ordem Nacional do Mérito Científico (National Order of Scientific Merit). In 2011, Prof. Szwarcfiter was elected a Member of the Brazilian Academy of Sciences.

== Books ==
- Markenzon, Lilian; Szwarcfiter, Jayme Luiz (1997). Estruturas de Dados e seus Algoritmos [Data Structures and their Algorithms] (in Portuguese). Rio de Janeiro: LTC. ISBN 85-2161-014-9.
- Szwarcfiter, Jayme Luiz (1988). Grafos e algoritmos computacionais [Graphs and computational algorithms] (in Portuguese). Rio de Janeiro: Campus. ISBN 85-7001-341-8.
- Szwarcfiter, Jayme Luiz (2018). Teoria Computacional de Grafos [Computational theory of Graphs] (in Portuguese). Rio de Janeiro: Elsevier. ISBN 978-85-3528-884-1.
