= Ewan Stafford Page =

British computer scientist (born 1928)

- Born: August 17, 1928 (age 98); Leicester, UK
- Known for: CUSUM

Academic background
- Education: University of Cambridge
- Thesis: Continuous Inspection Schemes and Monte Carlo Methods (1954)
- Doctoral advisor: Frank Anscombe

Ewan Stafford Page (born 17 August 1928) is a British academic and computer scientist, and former vice-chancellor of the University of Reading.

== Education and career ==
Page was born in Leicester and educated at Wyggeston Grammar School for Boys in Leicester and at Christ's College, Cambridge, where he graduated MA and PhD and won the Rayleigh Prize. His thesis was on change detection methods which was supervised by Frank Anscombe.

After a period of National Service, he was a research student in the field of statistics at the University of Cambridge between 1951 and 1954, at a time when the EDSAC computer was new. In 1957, he was appointed as director of the Durham University's Computing Laboratory, located at King's College, Newcastle. When King's College became Newcastle University, the Computing Laboratory became part of that University, and eventually Page was appointed a pro-vice-chancellor. In 1976, when the then incumbent died unexpectedly, he served as acting vice-chancellor of Newcastle University.

In 1979, Page was appointed vice-chancellor of the University of Reading, a position he held until 1993. He served as president of the British Computer Society in 1984/5.

== Books ==
- Page, Ewan Stafford; Wilson, Leslie Blackett (1978). Information, Representation and Manipulation in a Computer (second ed.). New York, NY, USA: Cambridge University Press. ISBN 978-0-521-29357-0.
- Page, Ewan Stafford; Wilson, Leslie Blackett (1979). An introduction to computational combinatorics. Cambridge Computer Science Texts. Vol. 9. New York, NY, USA: Cambridge University Press. ISBN 978-0-521-29492-8.
- Page, Ewan Stafford; Wilson, Leslie Blackett (1983). Information Representation and Manipulation Using Pascal. Cambridge Computer Science Texts. Vol. 15. New York, NY, USA: Cambridge University Press. ISBN 978-0-521-24954-6.
