= Interim analysis =

Science practice

In clinical trials and other scientific studies, an interim analysis is an analysis of data that is conducted before data collection has been completed. Clinical trials are unusual in that enrollment of subjects is a continual process staggered in time. If a treatment can be proven to be clearly beneficial or harmful compared to the concurrent control, or to be obviously futile, based on a pre-defined analysis of an incomplete data set while the study is on-going, the investigators may stop the study early.

== Statistical methods ==
The design of many clinical trials includes some strategy for early stopping if an interim analysis reveals large differences between treatment groups, or shows obvious futility such that there is no chance that continuing to the end would show a clinically meaningful effect. In addition to saving time and resources, such a design feature can reduce study participants' exposure to an inferior or useless treatment. However, when repeated significance testing on accumulating data is done, some adjustment of the usual hypothesis testing procedure must be made to maintain an overall significance level. The methods described by Pocock and O'Brien & Fleming, among others, are popular implementations of group sequential testing for clinical trials. Sometimes interim analyses are equally spaced in terms of calendar time or the information available from the data, but this assumption can be relaxed to allow for unplanned or unequally spaced analyses.

== Example ==
The second Multicenter Automatic Defibrillator Implantation Trial (MADIT II) was conducted to help better identify patients with coronary heart disease who would benefit from an ICD. MADIT II is the latest in a series of trials involving the use of ICDs to improve management and clinical treatment of arrhythmia patients. The Antiarrhythmics versus Implantable Defibrillators (AVID) Trial compared ICDs with antiarrhythmic-drug therapy (amiodarone or sotalol, predominantly the former) in patients who had survived life-threatening ventricular arrhythmias. After inclusion of 1,232 patients, the MADIT II study was terminated when interim analysis showed significant (31%) reduction in all-cause death in patients assigned to ICD therapy.

== See also ==
- Haybittle–Peto boundary
- Pocock boundary
- O'Brien–Fleming boundary
