= Passing–Bablok regression =

Medical statistical method

Passing–Bablok regression is a method from robust statistics for nonparametric regression analysis suitable for method comparison studies introduced by Wolfgang Bablok and Heinrich Passing in 1983. The procedure is adapted to fit linear errors-in-variables models. It is symmetrical and is robust in the presence of one or few outliers.

The Passing-Bablok procedure fits the parameters $a$ and $b$ of the linear equation $y = a + b * x$ using non-parametric methods. The coefficient $b$ is calculated by taking the shifted median of all slopes of the straight lines between any two points, disregarding lines for which the points are identical or $b = -1$. The median is shifted based on the number of slopes where $b < -1$ to create an approximately consistent estimator. The estimator is therefore close in spirit to the Theil-Sen estimator. The parameter $a$ is calculated by $a = \operatorname{median}({y_{i}-bx_{i})}$.

In 1986, Passing and Bablok extended their method introducing an equivariant extension for method transformation which also works when the slope $b$ is far from 1. It may be considered a robust version of reduced major axis regression. The slope estimator $b$ is the median of the absolute values of all pairwise slopes.

The original algorithm is rather slow for larger data sets as its computational complexity is $O(n^2)$. However, fast quasilinear algorithms of complexity $O(n$ ln $n)$ have been devised.

Passing and Bablok define a method for calculating a 95% confidence interval (CI) for both $a$ and $b$ in their original paper, which was later refined, though bootstrapping the parameters is the preferred method for in vitro diagnostics (IVD) when using patient samples. The Passing-Bablok procedure is valid only when a linear relationship exists between $x$ and $y$, which can be assessed by a CUSUM test. Further assumptions include the error ratio to be proportional to the slope $b$ and the similarity of the error distributions of the $x$ and $y$ distributions. The results are interpreted as follows. If 0 is in the CI of $a$, and 1 is in the CI of $b$, the two methods are comparable within the investigated concentration range. If 0 is not in the CI of $a$ there is a systematic difference and if 1 is not in the CI of $b$ then there is a proportional difference between the two methods.

However, the use of Passing–Bablok regression in method comparison studies has been criticized because it ignores random differences between methods.
