= Frank Anscombe =

English statistician

Francis Anscombe
- Born: 13 May 1918; Hove, East Sussex, UK
- Died: 17 October 2001 (aged 83); New Haven, Connecticut, USA
- Citizenship: United Kingdom
- Education: Trinity College, Cambridge
- Known for: Analysis of residuals Anscombe's quartet Anscombe transform
- Spouse: Phyllis Rapp
- Children: 4
- Scientific career
- Fields: Statistician
- Workplaces: University of Cambridge; Rothamsted Experimental Station; Princeton University; Yale University
- Doctoral students: John A. Hartigan; Ewan Stafford Page

Francis John Anscombe (13 May 1918 – 17 October 2001) was an English statistician.

== Education and career ==
Born in Hove in England, Anscombe was educated at Trinity College, Cambridge. After serving in the Second World War, he joined Rothamsted Experimental Station for two years before returning to Cambridge as a lecturer.

In experiments, Anscombe emphasized randomization in both the design and analysis phases. In the design phase, Anscombe argued that the experimenters should randomize the labels of blocks. In the analysis phase, Anscombe argued that the randomization plan should guide the analysis of data; Anscombe's approach has influenced John Nelder and R. A. Bailey in particular.

Anscombe moved to Princeton University in 1956, and in the same year he was elected as a Fellow of the American Statistical Association. He became the founding chairman of the statistics department at Yale University in 1963.

== Research ==
Anscombe illustrated the importance of graphing data with these four data sets.

According to David Cox, his best-known work may be his 1961 account of formal properties of residuals in linear regression. His earlier suggestion for a variance-stabilizing transformation for Poisson data is often known as the Anscombe transform.

He later became interested in statistical computing, and stressed that "a computer should make both calculations and graphs", and illustrated the importance of graphing data with four data sets now known as Anscombe's quartet. He later published a textbook on statistical computing in APL.

In economics and decision theory, Anscombe is best known for a 1963 paper with Robert Aumann which provides the standard basis for the theory of subjective probability.

== Personal life ==
In 1953, Anscombe visited Princeton University, where he worked with fellow statistician John Tukey. In Princeton, he married Phyllis Rapp, the sister of Tukey's wife Elizabeth. Anscombe and his wife had four children.
