= The Henry Smith Charity =

London-based charity

The Henry Smith Charity was founded in England in 1628 from the will of Henry Smith, a moneylender and landowner.

Henry Smith was born in Wandsworth in 1548. He was a City of London merchant, moneylender and alderman. From 1620 he began to establish various charitable trusts, and when he died in 1628 he left £1000 for the ransom of English sailors captured by Barbary pirates. His monument is in All Saints Church, Wandsworth.

The charity owned the Smith's Charity estate in Kensington which was established on farmland in Kensington and Chelsea in 1685. The Henry Smith Charity sold their South Kensington estate to the Wellcome Trust for £280 million in 1995.

Today, the charity makes a variety of grants, primarily to social welfare and disadvantaged groups. Beneficiaries include registered charities, community and Christian based organisations and individuals. At the end of the 2017 financial year the Henry Smith Charity had an income of £12.5 million with grants totalling £31 million. The charity had assets worth over £1 billion.
