= Stuart Pocock =

British medical statistician

Stuart J. Pocock is a British medical statistician. He has been professor of medical statistics at the London School of Hygiene & Tropical Medicine since 1989. His research interests include statistical methods for the design, monitoring, analysis and reporting of randomized clinical trials. He also collaborates on major clinical trials, particularly in cardiovascular disease.

In 2003, the Royal Statistical Society awarded him the Bradford Hill Medal "for his development of clinical trials methodology, including group sequential methods, his extensive applied work, notably in the epidemiology and treatment of heart disease, and his exposition of good practice nationally and internationally, especially through his book Clinical Trials: a Practical Approach and through his service on influential government committees."

In 2023, he was awarded the Transcatheter Cardiovascular Therapeutics (TCT) Career Achievement Award in recognition of his contributions to the field of interventional cardiology.

Among his most notable contributions to trial design are the Pocock stopping boundary and the win ratio.

== Books ==
- Pocock, Stuart (1983). Clinical Trials: A Practical Approach. Wiley-Blackwell. ISBN 978-0-471-90155-6.
- Pitt, Bertram; Julian, Desmond Gareth; Pocock, Stuart J., eds. (1997). Clinical Trials in Cardiology. W. B. Saunders. ISBN 978-0-7020-2156-5.
