= John Anscombe =

English cricketer

Personal information
- Born: 4 January 1838; Brighton, Sussex
- Died: 2 March 1881 (aged 43); Hurstpierpoint, Sussex
- Batting: Right-handed

Domestic team information
- Years: Team
- 1862: Sussex

Career statistics
Competition	First-class
Matches	3
Runs scored	7
Batting average	1.75
100s/50s	0/0
Top score	2
Catches/stumpings	1/3
- Source: CricketArchive, 15 August 2008

John Anscombe (4 January 1838 – 2 March 1881) was an English first-class cricketer who played for Sussex County Cricket Club. His highest score of 2 came when playing for Sussex in the match against Kent County Cricket Club.
