= Pocock boundary =

The Pocock boundary is a method for determining whether to stop a clinical trial prematurely. The typical clinical trial compares two groups of patients. One group are given a placebo or conventional treatment, while the other group of patients are given the treatment that is being tested. The investigators running the clinical trial will wish to stop the trial early for ethical reasons if the treatment group clearly shows evidence of benefit. In other words, "when early results proved so promising it was no longer fair to keep patients on the older drugs for comparison, without giving them the opportunity to change."

The concept was introduced by the medical statistician Stuart Pocock in 1977. The many reasons underlying when to stop a clinical trial for benefit were discussed in his editorial from 2005.

== Details ==
The Pocock boundary gives a p-value threshold for each interim analysis which guides the data monitoring committee on whether to stop the trial. The boundary used depends on the number of interim analyses.

List of p-values used at each interim analysis, assuming the overall p-value for the trial is 0.05
Number of planned analyses	Interim analysis	p-value threshold
2	1	0.0294
	2 (final)	0.0294
3	1	0.0221
	2	0.0221
	3 (final)	0.0221
4	1	0.0182
	2	0.0182
	3	0.0182
	4 (final)	0.0182
5	1	0.0158
	2	0.0158
	3	0.0158
	4	0.0158
	5 (final)	0.0158

The Pocock boundary is simple to use in that the p-value threshold is the same at each interim analysis. The disadvantages are that the number of interim analyses must be fixed at the start and it is not possible under this scheme to add analyses after the trial has started. Another disadvantage is that investigators and readers frequently do not understand how the p-values are reported: for example, if there are five interim analyses planned, but the trial is stopped after the third interim analysis because the p-value was 0.01, then the overall p-value for the trial is still reported as <0.05 and not as 0.01.

== See also ==
- Haybittle–Peto boundary
- O'Brien–Fleming boundary
- Interim analysis
