= Henry Smith (moneylender) =

English philanthropist (1549–1628)

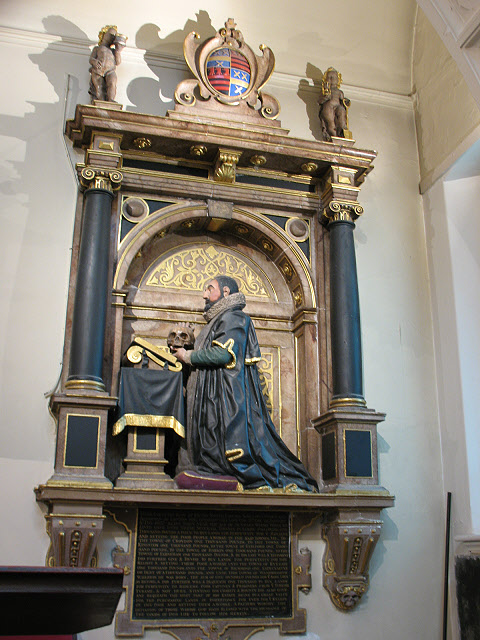
Smith's monument in All Saints Church, Wandsworth

Henry Smith (May 1549 – 3 January 1628) was an English moneylender and philanthropist. His nickname of "Dog" derives from a popular legend that he spent some time as a beggar with a dog as a companion. Smith lent to notable property owners such as Robert Devereux, 3rd Earl of Essex and Richard Sackville, 3rd Earl of Dorset and over time acquired estates of thousands of acres in size. In his will he left money for charitable purposes including for the benefit of the poor in a number of towns and parishes, for the support of his sister's descendants, for the victims of the Barbary slave trade and for the support of clergymen. The trust established by his endowment survives as the Henry Smith Charity, providing grants of tens of millions of pounds annually.

== Biography ==
Smith was born in Wandsworth, Surrey, in May 1549, to Walter Smith and his wife, whose maiden name was Wolphe; the family had their origins in Gloucestershire. Henry Smith settled in London where he joined the Worshipful Company of Salters.

By the late 1590s Smith had become a moneylender, and by 1597 was living in St Dunstan-in-the-East. Smith is known to have lent significant sums to Thomas Waller, a member of parliament in Kent, and to Robert Devereux, 3rd Earl of Essex. Through the business he acquired significant property holdings in Gloucestershire, Worcestershire, Middlesex and Kent. His most significant property lay in Sussex, including the manor of Eastbrook, Southwick, which Smith purchased in 1595 from Lord Charles Howard. Smith later added to this the estate of Warbleton, which had been surrendered to him by a debtor. Smith was a significant provider of finance to Richard Sackville, 3rd Earl of Dorset and purchased the earl's Knole estate in Kent which he leased back to the former owner for £100 per annum. Smith acted as a witness at the 1606 marriage of the earl's younger brother Edward Sackville to Mary Curzon.

Smith was elected an alderman of the London ward of Farringdon Without in February 1609 but served in the role only until May. In 1611 Smith purchased a house in Silver Street, in the parish of St Olave's. Smith was married but had no children. His nickname of "dog" was attributed to a popular legend that he spent some time as a beggar with an animal that followed him around.

Smith's money-lending business was damaged by the unexpected death of the 3rd Earl of Dorset in 1624, at the age of 35; the earl died owing Smith £9,000. Smith died on 3 January 1628 in his house in Silver Street and was buried in the chancel of All Saints Church, Wandsworth, on 7 February; a monument there shows him in the robes of an alderman. At the time of his death he owned thousands of acres of land and was the mortgagee of thousands more.

== Charitable contributions ==
=== Original bequest ===
Smith made several charitable contributions during his lifetime. This included grants of £1,000 each to the towns of Kingston, Croydon, Dorking, Farnham and Guildford during his lifetime. He urged the towns to follow the example of Dorchester which had set up institutions to provide work and education for the children of the poor. In October 1620 Smith established a number of trusts to distribute his wealth to charitable causes after his death.

In his will Smith left £200 to Mary Curzon and her children and made provisions for the support of the descendants of his sister, Joane. Further contributions of £1,000 were made to the towns of Reigate and Richmond (the latter never fully realised as it relied on a debt owed to Smith) and £500 to Wandsworth. He also left £10,000 to purchase impropriations of tithes "for the releife and maintenance of godlie preachers and the better furtherance of knowledg and Religion" [sic]. Again not all of these funds materialised as it was dependent on debts owed to Smith; at least £300 was found for the benefit of clergymen in Dorchester.

Smith also left £2,000 to purchase property to be held in trust, the rent of which was to be split half to benefit poor members of his family and half to support victims of the Barbary slave trade. Other bequests went for the benefit of the elderly and disabled poor, from which Smith excluded people judged to be "excessive drink[ers], whoremongers, common swearers, pilferers, or otherwise notoriously scandalous" as well as vagrants and those not resident in a parish for at least five years. Smith specified that the donations were to be in the form of clothing marked with Smith's name or bread and fish provided at the parish church on the Sabbath. By 1641 the trustees had accumulated property that brought £1,619 in rent per annum that was divided between 205 parishes. Around half of this was from estates that had been owned by Smith at the time of his death and the rest by properties purchased for the trust.

The trust distributed funds by making grants to individual Church of England parishes. This included almost every parish in Surrey as well as others across 21 counties. Pershore in Worcestershire received the most, £50 per year, but half of all the parishes received less than £5 annually and only 10% were granted more than £10. Some parishes were chosen by the trustees because of their local interests. Many of the trustees were puritans such as the Earl of Essex and the MP William Rolfe, but others such as Richard Lumley, 1st Viscount Lumley were Catholic.

Antiquarian Nathanael Salmon said that the parish omitted in Surrey was Mitcham, where Salmon said Smith had been flogged for vagrancy. Other accounts had Smith flogged in Leatherhead and leaving the parish only a whip in his will or having been refused alms and cursed by the women of Ashtead and leaving them only a scold's bridle. Smith in fact left money to each of these named parishes. The parishes were free to distribute Smith's funds as they saw fit; for example Kingston upon Thames established a clothing charity by 1630. Smith's aims of providing education to poor children seem to have largely come to nothing.

=== Henry Smith Charity ===
The original trustees purchased property in South Kensington and Chelsea, that brought in a relatively modest £130 a year. As London developed this land became the most valuable of the trust's holdings and included 84 acres (34 ha) in Kensington that was developed for housing in the 19th century, including Onslow Square. By 1869 the Charity Commission for England and Wales decried the expenditure of Smith's funds without discrimination as to those who needed it. In 1889 the Charity Commission reached agreement with the trustees on a scheme regulating the grants made to the descendants of Smith's sister who had reached 6,000 in number. These were known, under the terms of Smith's will, as the "poor kindred", and some continue to receive grants to this day.

The trust continues in its modern form as the Henry Smith Charity and, under a wider remit, by 2010 gave more than £25 million in grants for social and medical causes per year. Rather than grants to victims of Barbary pirates they now support women escaped from sex trafficking. The charity continues to support Church of England clergy, providing around £750,000 per year, which is distributed by church dioceses. The more than 200 individual parishes named in Smith's will and by his first trustees also continue to receive grants.

The charity's endowment reached £800 million in early 2008 but fell to £550 million during the 2008 financial crisis. The endowment grew to £950 million by 2017. That year, it introduced its first strategy for its activities, committing to distributing 4% of its endowment per year. By 2023, it was providing £47M in grants per year and had net assets of £1.26 billion.
