= O'Brien–Fleming boundary =

Statistical thresholds used in clinical trial designs

The O'Brien–Fleming (OBF) boundary is a set of statistical thresholds used in group-sequential clinical trial designs. It allows analyses (typically by a data monitoring committee) of accumulating data at several pre-specified interim points while still preserving the overall Type I error rate (the chance of a false-positive result) that was specified for the final analysis.

The boundary is conservative at early interim analyses—requiring very strong evidence to stop a trial early—and becomes less stringent as the study progresses. At the first interim looks the rule requires a very high test statistic (or equivalently a very low p-value) to declare significance. This protects against premature stopping on random fluctuations. As the trial progresses, the required statistic becomes less extreme. By the final analysis the boundary is essentially the nominal significance level (e.g., 0.05).

The method is a special case of the general parameterized method of Wang & Tsiatis. One disadvantage of the OBF boundary is that it requires prespecification of the number of interim analyses and the proportion of total information used at each analysis. More recent methods, such as the boundary method proposed by Lan and DeMets, allow dynamic allocation of the boundary values as the study progresses. Despite this limitation, the OBF boundaries are one of the most used methods for monitoring clinical studies.

== See also ==
- Haybittle–Peto boundary
- Pocock boundary
