= Anscombe transform =

Statistical concept

Standard deviation of the transformed Poisson random variable as a function of the mean $m$.

In statistics, the Anscombe transform, named after Francis Anscombe, is a variance-stabilizing transformation that transforms a random variable with a Poisson distribution into one with an approximately standard Gaussian distribution. The Anscombe transform is widely used in photon-limited imaging (astronomy, X-ray) where images naturally follow the Poisson law. The Anscombe transform is usually used to pre-process the data in order to make the standard deviation approximately constant. Then denoising algorithms designed for the framework of additive white Gaussian noise are used; the final estimate is then obtained by applying an inverse Anscombe transformation to the denoised data.

Anscombe transform animated. Here $\mu$ is the mean of the Anscombe-transformed Poisson distribution, normalized by subtracting by $2\sqrt{m + \tfrac{3}{8}} - \tfrac{1}{4 \, m^{1/2}}$, and $\sigma$ is its standard deviation (estimated empirically). We notice that $m^{3/2}\mu$ and $m^2 (\sigma-1)$ remains roughly in the range of $[0, 10]$ over the period, giving empirical support for $\mu = O(m^{-3/2}), \sigma =1+ O(m^{-2})$

== Definition ==
For the Poisson distribution the mean $m$ and variance $v$ are not independent: $m = v$. The Anscombe transform

$$A:x \mapsto 2 \sqrt{x + \tfrac{3}{8}} \,$$

aims at transforming the data so that the variance is set approximately 1 for large enough mean; for mean zero, the variance is still zero.

It transforms Poissonian data $x$ (with mean $m$) to approximately Gaussian data of mean $2\sqrt{m + \tfrac{3}{8}} - \tfrac{1}{4 \, m^{1/2}} + O\left(\tfrac{1}{m^{3/2}}\right)$ and standard deviation $1 + O\left(\tfrac{1}{m^2}\right)$. This approximation gets more accurate for larger $m$, as can be also seen in the figure.

For a transformed variable of the form $2 \sqrt{x + c}$, the expression for the variance has an additional term $\frac{\tfrac{3}{8} -c}{m}$; it is reduced to zero at $c = \tfrac{3}{8}$, which is exactly the reason why this value was picked.

== Inversion ==
When the Anscombe transform is used in denoising (i.e. when the goal is to obtain from $x$ an estimate of $m$), its inverse transform is also needed in order to return the variance-stabilized and denoised data $y$ to the original range. Applying the algebraic inverse

$$A^{-1}:y \mapsto \left( \frac{y}{2} \right)^2 - \frac{3}{8}$$

usually introduces undesired bias to the estimate of the mean $m$, because the forward square-root transform is not linear. Sometimes using the asymptotically unbiased inverse

$$y \mapsto \left( \frac{y}{2} \right)^2 - \frac{1}{8}$$

mitigates the issue of bias, but this is not the case in photon-limited imaging, for which the exact unbiased inverse given by the implicit mapping

$$\operatorname{E} \left[ 2\sqrt{x+\tfrac{3}{8}} \mid m \right] = 2  \sum_{x=0}^{+\infty} \left( \sqrt{x+\tfrac{3}{8}} \cdot \frac{m^x e^{-m}}{x!} \right) \mapsto m$$

should be used. A closed-form approximation of this exact unbiased inverse is

$$y \mapsto \frac{1}{4} y^2 - \frac{1}{8} + \frac{1}{4} \sqrt{\frac{3}{2}} y^{-1} - \frac{11}{8} y^{-2} + \frac{5}{8} \sqrt{\frac{3}{2}} y^{-3}.$$

== Alternatives ==
There are many other possible variance-stabilizing transformations for the Poisson distribution. Bar-Lev and Enis report a family of such transformations which includes the Anscombe transform. Another member of the family is the Freeman-Tukey transformation

$$A:x \mapsto \sqrt{x+1}+\sqrt{x}. \,$$

A simplified transformation, obtained as the primitive of the reciprocal of the standard deviation of the data, is

$$A:x \mapsto 2\sqrt{x} \,$$

which, while it is not quite so good at stabilizing the variance, has the advantage of being more easily understood. Indeed, from the delta method,

$V[2\sqrt{x}] \approx \left(\frac{d (2\sqrt{m})}{d m} \right)^2 V[x] = \left(\frac{1}{\sqrt{m}} \right)^2 m = 1$.

== Generalization ==
While the Anscombe transform is appropriate for pure Poisson data, in many applications the data presents also an additive Gaussian component. These cases are treated by a Generalized Anscombe transform and its asymptotically unbiased or exact unbiased inverses.

== See also ==
- Variance-stabilizing transformation
- Box–Cox transformation
