= John Haybittle =

- Born: 18 October 1922
- Died: 19 November 2017 (aged 95)
- Occupation: Medical physicist
- Employer: Addenbrooke's Hospital
- Website: Röntgen Prize (1972); Barclay Medal (1987)

Dr John Leslie Haybittle (18 October 1922 - 19 November 2017) was a British medical physicist.

Haybittle took up a position as junior physicist at Addenbrooke's Hospital in 1948. He worked there until retirement in 1982, by which time he was Chief Physicist.

He served as secretary of the British Institute of Radiology from 1962 to 1967, and was editor of the British Journal of Radiology from 1981 to 1986.

He was awarded the British Institute of Radiology's Röntgen Prize in 1972 and their Barclay Medal in 1987.

He is a co-inventor, with Richard Peto, of the Haybittle–Peto boundary.
