= Journal of the Brazilian Computer Society =

- Discipline: Computer science
- Language: English
- Edited by: Maria Cristina Ferreira de Oliveira

Publication details
- History: 1994 to present
- Publisher: Brazilian Computer Society (Brazil)
- Frequency: Quarterly
- Open access: Yes

Standard abbreviations
- ISO 4: J. Braz. Comput. Soc.

Indexing
- ISSN: 0104-6500 (print); 1678-4804 (web)

Links
- Journal homepage

The Journal of the Brazilian Computer Society (JBCS) is the flagship scientific journal of the Brazilian Computer Society (SBC). It is a quarterly journal. Its aim is to publish original research papers, serving as a forum for disseminating innovative research in all aspects of computer science. The priorities of the journal are quality and timeliness.

The first edition of the newspaper appeared in July 1994. For purposes of citation, the abbreviation 'J. Braz. Comp. Soc.' is often used.

JBCS is supported by the:

- Programa de Apoio a Publicações Científicas of the Ministério da Ciência e Tecnologia.
- Conselho Nacional de Desenvolvimento Científico e Tecnológico (CNPq).
- Conselho de Aperfeiçoamento do Ensino Superior (CAPES).
- Ministério da Educação (MEC).
