= Haybittle–Peto boundary =

The Haybittle–Peto boundary is a rule for deciding when to stop a clinical trial prematurely. It is named for John Haybittle and Richard Peto.

The typical clinical trial compares two groups of patients. One group is given a placebo or conventional treatment, while the other group of patients are given the treatment that is being tested. The investigators running the clinical trial will wish to stop the trial early for ethical reasons if the treatment group clearly shows evidence of benefit. In other words, "when early results proved so promising it was no longer fair to keep patients on the older drugs for comparison, without giving them the opportunity to change."

The Haybittle–Peto boundary is one such stopping rule, and it states that if an interim analysis shows a probability equal to, or less than 0.001 that a difference as extreme or more between the treatments is found, given that the null hypothesis is true, then the trial should be stopped early. The final analysis is still evaluated at the normal level of significance (usually 0.05). The main advantage of the Haybittle–Peto boundary is that the same threshold is used at every interim analysis, unlike the O'Brien–Fleming boundary, which changes at every analysis. Also, using the Haybittle–Peto boundary means that the final analysis is performed using a 0.05 level of significance as normal, which makes it easier for investigators and readers to understand. The main argument against the Haybittle–Peto boundary is that some investigators believe that the Haybittle–Peto boundary is too conservative and makes it too difficult to stop a trial.

List of p-values used at each interim analysis, assuming the overall p-value for the trial is 0.05
Number of planned analyses	Interim analysis	p-value threshold
2	1	0.001
	2 (final)	0.05
3	1	0.001
	2	0.001
	3 (final)	0.05
4	1	0.001
	2	0.001
	3	0.001
	4 (final)	0.05
5	1	0.001
	2	0.001
	3	0.001
	4	0.001
	5 (final)	0.05

== Synonyms ==
- Peto boundary
- Peto method
- Peto criteria

== See also ==
- Pocock boundary
- Interim analysis
- O'Brien–Fleming boundary
