= Variance-stabilizing transformation =

Concept in applied statistics

In applied statistics, a variance-stabilizing transformation is a data transformation that is specifically chosen either to simplify considerations in graphical exploratory data analysis or to allow the application of simple regression-based or analysis of variance techniques.

== Overview ==
The aim behind the choice of a variance-stabilizing transformation is to find a simple function ƒ to apply to values x in a data set to create new values y = ƒ(x) such that the variability of the values y is not related to their mean value. For example, suppose that the values x are realizations from different Poisson distributions: i.e. the distributions each have different mean values μ. Then, because for the Poisson distribution the variance is identical to the mean, the variance varies with the mean. However, if the simple variance-stabilizing transformation

$$y=\sqrt{x} \,$$

is applied, the sampling variance associated with observation will be nearly constant: see Anscombe transform for details and some alternative transformations.

While variance-stabilizing transformations are well known for certain parametric families of distributions, such as the Poisson and the binomial distribution, some types of data analysis proceed more empirically: for example by searching among power transformations to find a suitable fixed transformation. Alternatively, if data analysis suggests a functional form for the relation between variance and mean, this can be used to deduce a variance-stabilizing transformation. Thus if, for a mean μ,

$$\operatorname{var}(X)=h(\mu), \,$$

a suitable basis for a variance stabilizing transformation would be

$$y \propto \int^x \frac{1}{\sqrt{h(\mu)}} \, d\mu,$$

where the arbitrary constant of integration and an arbitrary scaling factor can be chosen for convenience.

=== Example: relative variance ===
If X is a positive random variable and for some constant, s, the variance is given as h(μ) = s^{2}μ^{2} then the standard deviation is proportional to the mean, which is called fixed relative error. In this case, the variance-stabilizing transformation is

$$y = \int^x \frac{d\mu}{\sqrt{s^2\mu^2}} = \frac{1}{s} \ln(x) \propto \log(x)\,.$$

That is, the variance-stabilizing transformation is the logarithmic transformation.

=== Example: absolute plus relative variance ===
If the variance is given as h(μ) = σ^{2} + s^{2}μ^{2} then the variance is dominated by a fixed variance σ^{2} when |μ| is small enough and is dominated by the relative variance s^{2}μ^{2} when |μ| is large enough. In this case, the variance-stabilizing transformation is

$$y = \int^x \frac{d\mu}{\sqrt{\sigma^2 + s^2\mu^2}}
= \frac{1}{s} \operatorname{asinh} \frac{x}{\sigma / s}
\propto \operatorname{asinh} \frac{x}{\lambda}\,.$$

That is, the variance-stabilizing transformation is the inverse hyperbolic sine of the scaled value x / λ for λ = σ / s.

=== Example: pearson correlation ===
The Fisher transformation is a variance stabilizing transformation for the pearson correlation coefficient.

== Relationship to the delta method ==
Here the delta method is presented informally to show the link to variance-stabilizing transformations. For a more formal statement of the delta method, see Delta method.

Let $X$ be a random variable, with $E[X]=\mu$ and $\operatorname{Var}(X)=\sigma^2$. Define $Y=g(X)$, where $g$ is a regular function. A first order Taylor approximation for $Y=g(x)$ is:

$Y = g(X) \approx g(\mu)+g'(\mu)(X-\mu)$

From the equation above, we obtain:

$E[Y] \approx g(\mu)$ and $\operatorname{Var}[Y] \approx \sigma^2g'(\mu)^2$

This approximation method is called delta method.

Consider now a random variable $X$ such that $E[X]=\mu$ and $\operatorname{Var}[X]=h(\mu)$. Notice the relation between the variance and the mean, which implies, for example, heteroscedasticity in a linear model. Therefore, the goal is to find a function $g$ such that $Y=g(X)$ has a variance independent (at least approximately) of its expectation.

Imposing the condition $\operatorname{Var}[Y]\approx h(\mu)g'(\mu)^2=\text{constant}$, this equality implies the differential equation:

$$\frac{dg}{d\mu}=\frac{C}{\sqrt{h(\mu)}}$$

This ordinary differential equation has, by separation of variables, the following solution:

$$g(\mu)=\int \frac{C\,d\mu}{\sqrt{h(\mu)}}$$

This last expression appeared for the first time in a M. S. Bartlett paper.
