= Change detection =

Statistical analysis

Yearly volume of the Nile river at Aswan, an example of time series data commonly used in change detection. Dotted line denotes a detected change point when Old Aswan Dam was built in 1902.

In statistical analysis, change detection or change point detection tries to identify times when the probability distribution of a stochastic process or time series changes. In general the problem concerns both detecting whether or not a change has occurred, or whether several changes might have occurred, and identifying the times of any such changes.

Specific applications, like step detection and edge detection, may be concerned with changes in the mean, variance, correlation, or spectral density of the process. More generally change detection also includes the detection of anomalous behavior: anomaly detection.

In offline change point detection it is assumed that a sequence of length $T$ is available and the goal is to identify whether any change point(s) occurred in the series. This is an example of post hoc analysis and is often approached using hypothesis testing methods. By contrast, online change point detection is concerned with detecting change points in an incoming data stream.

== Background ==
A time series measures the progression of one or more quantities over time. For instance, the figure above shows the level of water in the Nile river between 1870 and 1970. Change point detection is concerned with identifying whether, and if so when, the behavior of the series changes significantly. In the Nile river example, the volume of water changes significantly after a dam was built in the river. Importantly, anomalous observations that differ from the ongoing behavior of the time series are not generally considered change points as long as the series returns to its previous behavior afterwards.

Mathematically, we can describe a time series as an ordered sequence of observations $(x_1, x_2, \ldots)$. We can write the joint distribution of a subset $x_{a:b} = (x_a, x_{a+1}, \ldots, x_{b})$ of the time series as $p(x_{a:b})$. If the goal is to determine whether a change point occurred at a time $\tau$ in a finite time series of length $T$, then we really ask whether $p(x_{1:\tau})$ equals $p(x_{\tau+1:T})$. This problem can be generalized to the case of more than one change point.

== Algorithms ==
=== Online change detection ===
Using the sequential analysis ("online") approach, any change test must make a trade-off between these common metrics:

- False alarm rate
- Misdetection rate
- Detection delay

In a Bayes change-detection problem, a prior distribution is available for the change time.

Online change detection is also done using streaming algorithms.

=== Offline change detection ===
Basseville (1993, Section 2.6) discusses offline change-in-mean detection with hypothesis testing based on the works of Page and Picard and maximum-likelihood estimation of the change time, related to two-phase regression. Other approaches employ clustering based on maximum likelihood estimation,, use optimization to infer the number and times of changes, via spectral analysis, or singular spectrum analysis.

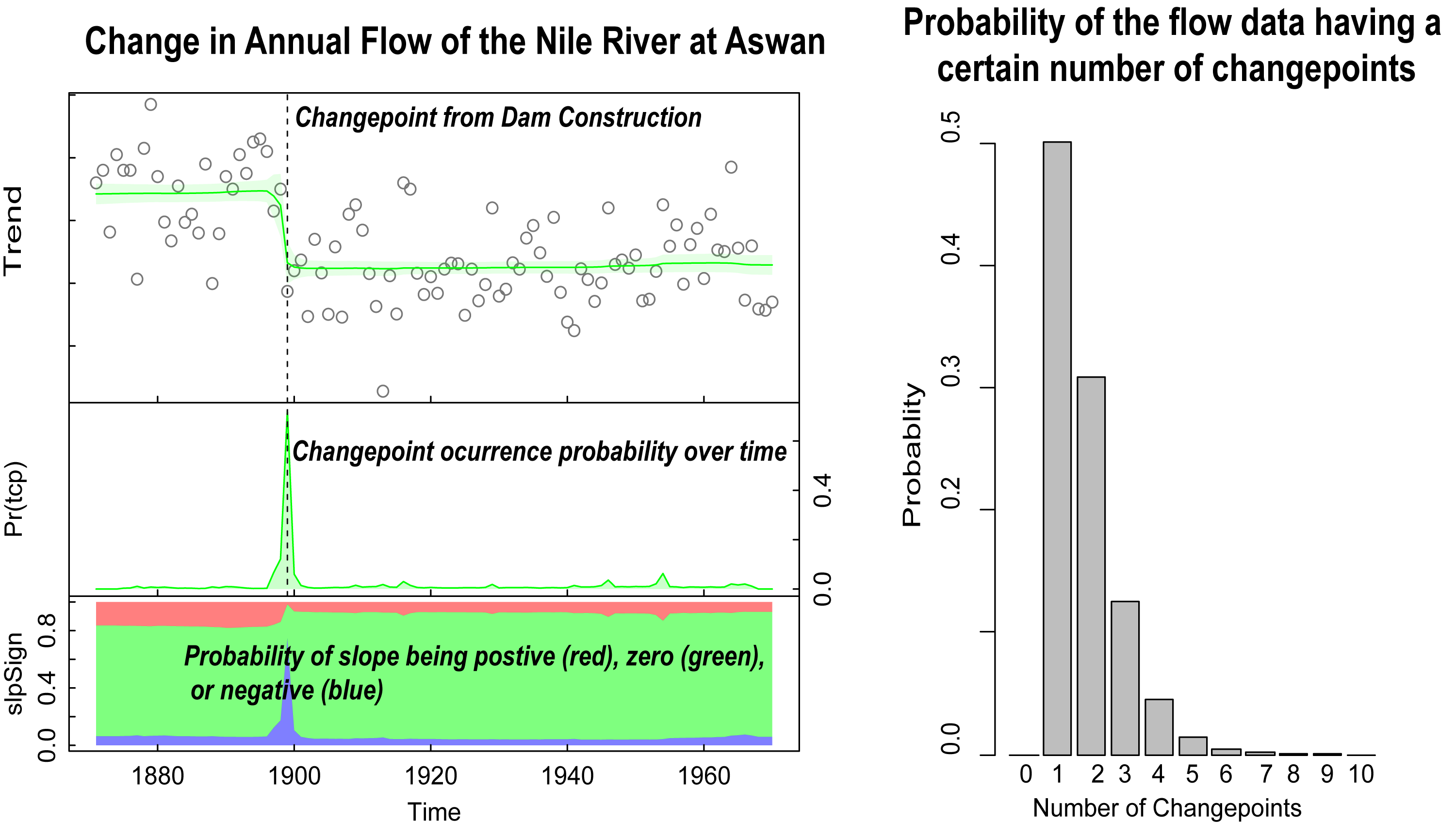
Detection of changepoints in the Nile River flow data using a Bayesian method

Statistically speaking, change detection is often considered as a model selection problem. Models with more changepoints fit data better but with more parameters. The best trade-off can be found by optimizing a model selection criterion such as Akaike information criterion and Bayesian information criterion. Bayesian model selection has also been used. Bayesian methods often quantify uncertainties of all sorts and answer questions hard to tackle by classical methods, such as what is the probability of having a change at a given time and what is the probability of the data having a certain number of changepoints.

"Offline" approaches cannot be used on streaming data because they need to compare to statistics of the complete time series, and cannot react to changes in real-time but often provide a more accurate estimation of the change time and magnitude.

== Applications ==
Change detection tests are often used in manufacturing for quality control, intrusion detection, spam filtering, website tracking, and medical diagnostics.

=== Linguistic change detection ===
Linguistic change detection refers to the ability to detect word-level changes across multiple presentations of the same sentence. Researchers have found that the amount of semantic overlap (i.e., relatedness) between the changed word and the new word influences the ease with which such a detection is made (Sturt, Sanford, Stewart, & Dawydiak, 2004). Additional research has found that focussing one's attention to the word that will be changed during the initial reading of the original sentence can improve detection. This was shown using italicized text to focus attention, whereby the word that will be changing is italicized in the original sentence (Sanford, Sanford, Molle, & Emmott, 2006), as well as using clefting constructions such as "It was the tree that needed water." (Kennette, Wurm, & Van Havermaet, 2010). These change-detection phenomena appear to be robust, even occurring cross-linguistically when bilinguals read the original sentence in their native language and the changed sentence in their second language (Kennette, Wurm & Van Havermaet, 2010). Recently, researchers have detected word-level changes in semantics across time by computationally analyzing temporal corpora (for example: the word "gay" has acquired a new meaning over time) using change point detection. This is also applicable to reading non-words such as music. Even though music is not a language, it is still written and people to comprehend its meaning which involves perception and attention, allowing change detection to be present.

=== Visual change detection ===
Visual change detection is one's ability to detect differences between two or more images or scenes. This is essential in many everyday tasks. One example is detecting changes on the road to drive safely and successfully. Change detection is crucial in operating motor vehicles to detect other vehicles, traffic control signals, pedestrians, and more. Another example of utilizing visual change detection is facial recognition. When noticing one's appearance, change detection is vital, as faces are "dynamic" and can change in appearance due to different factors such as "lighting conditions, facial expressions, aging, and occlusion". Change detection algorithms use various techniques, such as "feature tracking, alignment, and normalization," to capture and compare different facial features and patterns across individuals in order to correctly identify people. Visual change detection involves the integration of "multiple sensors inputs, cognitive processes, and attentional mechanisms," often focusing on multiple stimuli at once. The brain processes visual information from the eyes, compares it with previous knowledge stored in memory, and identifies differences between the two stimuli. This process occurs rapidly and unconsciously, allowing individuals to respond to changing environments and make necessary adjustments to their behavior.

=== Cognitive change detection ===
There have been several studies conducted to analyze the cognitive functions of change detection. With cognitive change detection, researchers have found that most people overestimate their change detection, when in reality, they are more susceptible to change blindness than they think. Cognitive change detection has many complexities based on external factors, and sensory pathways play a key role in determining one's success in detecting changes. One study proposes and proves that the multi-sensory pathway network, which consists of three sensory pathways, significantly increases the effectiveness of change detection. Sensory pathway one fuses the stimuli together, sensory pathway two involves using the middle concatenation strategy to learn the changed behavior, and sensory pathway three involves using the middle difference strategy to learn the changed behavior. With all three of these working together, change detection has a significantly increased success rate. It was previously believed that the posterior parietal cortex (PPC) played a role in enhancing change detection due to its focus on "sensory and task-related activity". However, studies have also disproven that the PPC is necessary for change detection; although these have high functional correlation with each other, the PPC's mechanistic involvement in change detection is insignificant. Moreover, top-down processing plays an important role in change detection because it enables people to resort to background knowledge which then influences perception, which is also common in children. Researchers have conducted a longitudinal study surrounding children's development and the change detection throughout infancy to adulthood. In this, it was found that change detection is stronger in young infants compared to older children, with top-down processing being a main contributor to this outcome.

== See also ==
- Structural break—Change in model structure
- Detection theory
- Hypothesis testing
- Recall rate
- Receiver operating characteristic
- Change blindness
