= Tie rod =

Slender structural unit

A tie rod or tie bar (also known as a hanger rod if vertical) is a slender structural unit used as a tie and (in most applications) capable of carrying tensile loads only. It is any rod or bar-shaped structural member designed to prevent the separation of two parts, as in a vehicle.

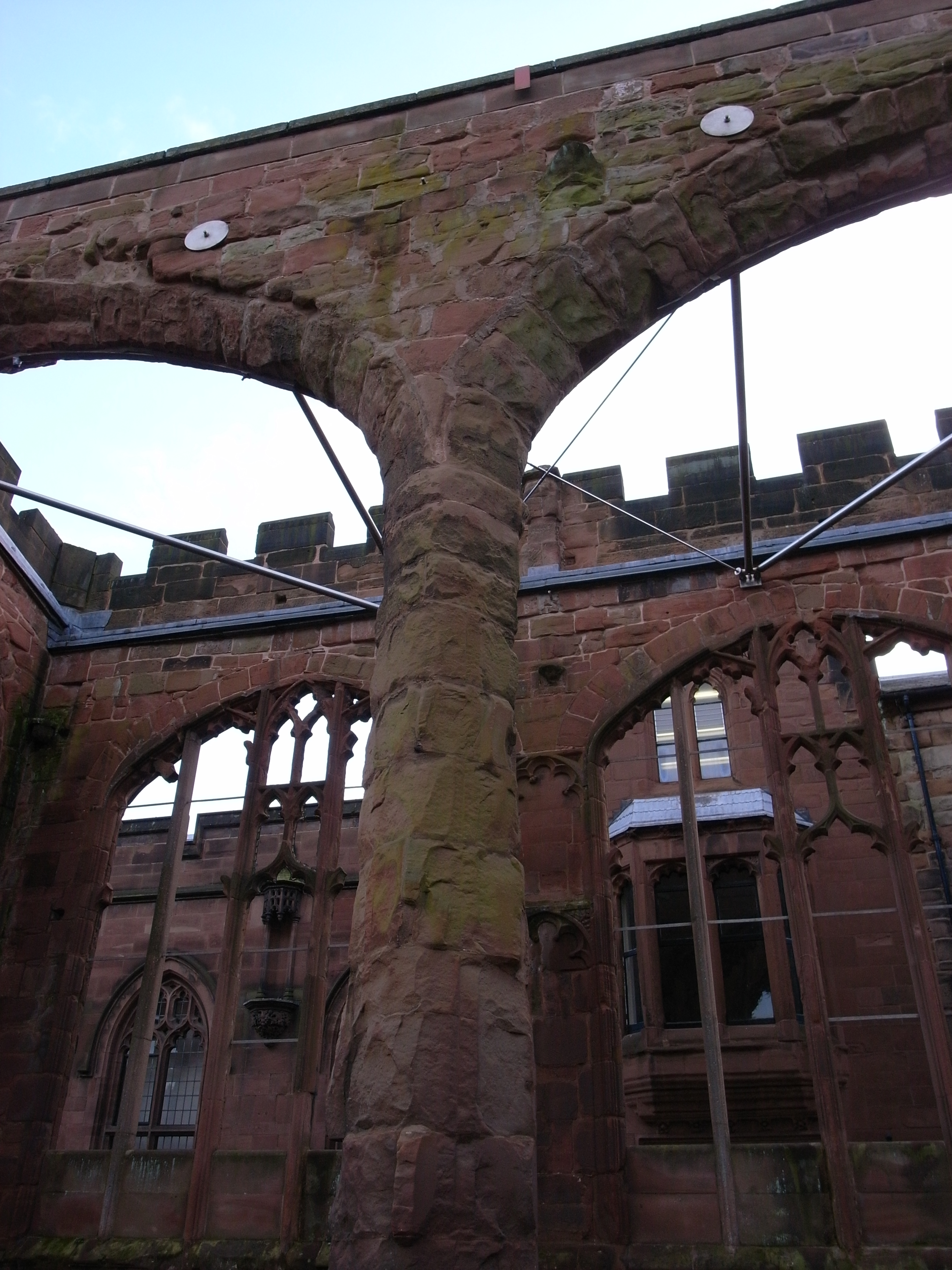
Tie rods and anchor plates in the ruins of Coventry Cathedral

== Subtypes and examples of applications ==
- In airplane structures, tie rods are sometimes used in the fuselage or wings.
- Tie rods are often used in steel structures, such as bridges, industrial buildings, tanks, towers, and cranes.
- Sometimes tie rods are retrofitted to bowing or subsiding masonry walls (brick, block, stone, etc.) to keep them from succumbing to lateral forces. The ends of the rods are secured by anchor plates which may be visible from the outside.
- The rebar used in reinforced concrete is not referred to as a "tie rod", but it essentially performs some of the same tension-force-counteracting purposes that tie rods perform.
- In automobiles, the tie rods are part of the steering mechanism. They differ from the archetypal tie rod by both pushing and pulling (operating in both tension and compression). In the UK, these items are generally referred to as track rods.
- In steam locomotives, a tie rod is a rod that connects several driving wheels to transmit the power from the connecting rod.
- Tie rods known as sag rods are sometimes used in connection with purlins to take the component of the loads which is parallel to the roof.
- The spokes of bicycle wheels are tie rods.
- In ships, tie rods are bolts which keep the whole engine structure under compression. They provide for fatigue strength. They also provide for proper running gear alignment which prevents fretting. They help to reduce the bending stress being transmitted to the transverse girder.

== Physics and engineering principles ==
In general, because the ratio of the typical tie rod's length to its cross section is usually very large, it would buckle under the action of compressive forces. The working strength of a tie rod is the product of the allowable working stress and the rod's minimum cross-sectional area.

If threads are cut into a cylindrical rod, that minimum area occurs at the root of the thread. Often rods are upset (made thicker at the ends) so that the tie rod does not become weaker when threads are cut into it.

Tie rods may be connected at the ends in various ways, but it is desirable that the strength of the connection should be at least equal to the strength of the rod. The ends may be threaded and passed through drilled holes or shackles and retained by nuts screwed on the ends. If the ends are threaded right- and left-hand the length between points of loading may be altered. This furnishes a second method for pre-tensioning the rod at will by turning it in the nuts so that the length will be changed. A turnbuckle will accomplish the same purpose. The ends may also be swaged to receive a fitting which is connected to the supports. Another way of making end connections is to forge an eye or hook on the rod.

An infamous structural failure involving tie rods is the Hyatt Regency walkway collapse in Kansas City, Missouri, on July 17, 1981. The hotel had a large atrium with three walkways crossing it suspended from tie rods. Construction errors led to several of the walkways collapsing, killing 114 people and injuring over 200.

== Geometry ==
Osgood and Graustein used the rectangular hyperbola, its conjugate hyperbola, and conjugate diameters to rationalize tie rods at 15 degree radial spacing, to a square of girders, from its center. The tie-rods to the corners (45°) correspond to the asymptotes, while the pair at 15° and 75° are conjugate, as are the pair at 30° and 60°. According to this model in linear elasticity, the application of a load compressing the square results in a deformation where the tie rods maintain their conjugate relations.

== See also ==
- Guy-wire
- Tie (engineering)
