= Translation of axes =

Transformation of coordinates that moves the origin

Translation of axes

In mathematics, a translation of axes in two dimensions is a mapping from an xy-Cartesian coordinate system to an x'y'-Cartesian coordinate system in which the x' axis is parallel to the x axis and k units away, and the y' axis is parallel to the y axis and h units away. This means that the origin O' of the new coordinate system has coordinates (h, k) in the original system. The positive x' and y' directions are taken to be the same as the positive x and y directions. A point P has coordinates (x, y) with respect to the original system and coordinates (x', y') with respect to the new system, where

$x = x' + h$ and $y = y' + k$	1

or equivalently

$x' = x - h$ and $y' = y - k .$	2

In the new coordinate system, the point P will appear to have been translated in the opposite direction. For example, if the xy-system is translated a distance h to the right and a distance k upward, then P will appear to have been translated a distance h to the left and a distance k downward in the x'y'-system . A translation of axes in more than two dimensions is defined similarly. A translation of axes is a rigid transformation, but not a linear map. (See Affine transformation.)

== Motivation ==
Coordinate systems are essential for studying the equations of curves using the methods of analytic geometry. To use the method of coordinate geometry, the axes are placed at a convenient position with respect to the curve under consideration. For example, to study the equations of ellipses and hyperbolas, the foci are usually located on one of the axes and are situated symmetrically with respect to the origin. If the curve (hyperbola, parabola, ellipse, etc.) is not situated conveniently with respect to the axes, the coordinate system should be changed to place the curve at a convenient and familiar location and orientation. The process of making this change is called a transformation of coordinates.

The solutions to many problems can be simplified by translating the coordinate axes to obtain new axes parallel to the original ones.

== Translation of conic sections ==
Through a change of coordinates, the equation of a conic section can be put into a standard form, which is usually easier to work with. For the most general equation of the second degree, which takes the form

$Ax^2 + Bxy + Cy^2 + Dx + Ey + F = 0$ ($A$, $B$ and $C$ not all zero);	3

it is always possible to perform a rotation of axes in such a way that in the new system the equation takes the form

$Ax^2 + Cy^2 + Dx + Ey + F = 0$ ($A$ and $C$ not both zero);	4

that is, eliminating the xy term. Next, a translation of axes can reduce an equation of the form (3) to an equation of the same form but with new variables (x', y') as coordinates, and with D and E both equal to zero (with certain exceptions—for example, parabolas). The principal tool in this process is "completing the square." In the examples that follow, it is assumed that a rotation of axes has already been performed.

=== Example 1 ===
Given the equation

$$9x^2 + 25y^2 + 18x - 100y - 116 = 0 ,$$

by using a translation of axes, determine whether the locus of the equation is a parabola, ellipse, or hyperbola. Determine foci (or focus), vertices (or vertex), and eccentricity.

Solution: To complete the square in x and y, write the equation in the form

$$9(x^2 + 2x) + 25(y^2 - 4y) = 116 .$$

Complete the squares and obtain

$$9(x^2 + 2x + 1) + 25(y^2 - 4y + 4) = 116 + 9 + 100$$
$$\Leftrightarrow 9(x + 1)^2 + 25(y - 2)^2 = 225 .$$

Define

$x' = x + 1$ and $y' = y - 2 .$

That is, the translation in equations (2) is made with $h = -1, k = 2 .$ The equation in the new coordinate system is

$9x'^2 + 25y'^2 = 225 .$	5

Divide equation (5) by 225 to obtain

$$\frac{x'^2}{25} + \frac{y'^2}{9} = 1 ,$$

which is recognizable as an ellipse with $a = 5, b = 3, c^2 = a^2 - b^2 = 16, c = 4, e = \tfrac{4}{5} .$ In the x'y'-system, we have: center $(0, 0)$; vertices $(\pm 5, 0)$; foci $(\pm 4, 0) .$

In the xy-system, use the relations $x = x' - 1, y = y' + 2$ to obtain: center $(-1, 2)$; vertices $(4, 2), (-6, 2)$; foci $(3, 2), (-5, 2)$; eccentricity $\tfrac{4}{5} .$

== Generalization to several dimensions ==
For an xyz-Cartesian coordinate system in three dimensions, suppose that a second Cartesian coordinate system is introduced, with axes x', y' and z' so located that the x' axis is parallel to the x axis and h units from it, the y' axis is parallel to the y axis and k units from it, and the z' axis is parallel to the z axis and l units from it. A point P in space will have coordinates in both systems. If its coordinates are (x, y, z) in the original system and (x', y', z') in the second system, the equations

$x' = x - h, \qquad y' = y - k, \qquad z' = z - l$	6

hold. Equations (6) define a translation of axes in three dimensions where (h, k, l) are the xyz-coordinates of the new origin. A translation of axes in any finite number of dimensions is defined similarly.

== Translation of quadric surfaces ==
In three-space, the most general equation of the second degree in x, y and z has the form

$Ax^2 + By^2 + Cz^2 + Dxy + Exz + Fyz + Gx + Hy + Iz + J = 0 ,$	7

where the quantities $A, B, C, \ldots , J$ are positive or negative numbers or zero. The points in space satisfying such an equation all lie on a surface. Any second-degree equation which does not reduce to a cylinder, plane, line, or point corresponds to a surface which is called quadric.

As in the case of plane analytic geometry, the method of translation of axes may be used to simplify second-degree equations, thereby making evident the nature of certain quadric surfaces. The principal tool in this process is "completing the square."

=== Example 2 ===
Use a translation of coordinates to identify the quadric surface

$$x^2 + 4y^2 + 3z^2 + 2x - 8y + 9z = 10 .$$

Solution: Write the equation in the form

$$x^2 + 2x \qquad + 4(y^2 - 2y) + 3(z^2 + 3z) = 10 .$$

Complete the square to obtain

$$(x + 1)^2 + 4(y - 1)^2 + 3(z + \tfrac{3}{2})^2 = 10 + 1 + 4 + \tfrac{27}{4} .$$

Introduce the translation of coordinates

$$x' = x + 1, \qquad y' = y - 1, \qquad z' = z + \tfrac{3}{2} .$$

The equation of the surface takes the form

$$x'^2 + 4y'^2 + 3z'^2 = \tfrac{87}{4} ,$$

which is recognizable as the equation of an ellipsoid.

== See also ==
- Change of basis
- Translation (geometry)
