= Rytz's construction =

Method of finding axes and veritces of an ellipse

Rytz construction: start - end

The Rytz’s axis construction is a basic method of descriptive geometry to find the axes, the semi-major axis and semi-minor axis and the vertices of an ellipse, starting from two conjugated half-diameters. If the center and the semi axis of an ellipse are determined the ellipse can be drawn using an ellipsograph or by hand (see ellipse).

Rytz’s construction is a classical construction of Euclidean geometry, in which only compass and ruler are allowed as aids. The design is named after its inventor David Rytz of Brugg (1801–1868).

Conjugate diameters appear always if a circle or an ellipse is projected parallelly (the rays are parallel) as images of orthogonal diameters of a circle (see second diagram) or as images of the axes of an ellipse. An essential property of two conjugate diameters $d_1,\;d_2$ is: The tangents at the ellipse points of one diameter are parallel to the second diameter (see second diagram).

Cube with circles: military projection

Rytz's construction in 6 steps. Given: center C and two conjugate half diameters CP, CQ of an ellipse. sought: the semi-axes and the vertices of the ellipse.

== Problem statement and solution ==
The parallel projection (skew or orthographic) of a circle that is in general an ellipse (the special case of a line segment as image is omitted). A fundamental task in descriptive geometry is to draw such an image of a circle. The diagram shows a military projection of a cube with 3 circles on 3 faces of the cube. The image plane for a military projection is horizontal. That means the circle on the top appears in its true shape (as circle). The images of the circles at the other two faces are obviously ellipses with unknown axes. But one recognizes in any case the images of two orthogonal diameters of the circles. These diameters of the ellipses are no more orthogonal but as images of orthogonal diameters of the circle they are conjugate (the tangents at the end points of one diameter are parallel to the other diameter !). This is a standard situation in descriptive geometry:

- From an ellipse the center $C$ and two points $P,Q$ on two conjugate diameters are known.
- Task: find the axes and semi-axes of the ellipse.

=== Steps of the construction ===
(1) rotate point $P$ around $C$ by 90°.
(2) Determine the center $D$ of the line segment $\overline{P'Q}$.
(3) Draw the line $P'Q$ and the circle with center $D$ through $C$. Intersect the circle and the line. The intersection points are $A,B$.
(4) The lines $CA$ and $CB$ are the axes of the ellipse.
(5) The line segment $\overline{AB}$ can be considered as a paperstrip of length $a+b$ (see ellipse) generating point $Q$. Hence $a=|AQ|$ and $b=|BQ|$ are the semi-axes. (If $a>b$ then $a$ is the semi-major axis.)
(6) The vertices and co-vertices are known and the ellipse can be drawn by one of the drawing methods.

If one performs a left turn of point $P$, then the configuration shows the 2nd paper strip method (see second diagram in next section) and $a=|AQ|$ and $b=|BQ|$ is still true.

== Proof of the statement ==
Rytz: proof

The standard proof is performed geometrically. An alternative proof uses analytic geometry:

The proof is done, if one is able to show that

- the intersection points $U,V$ of the line $P'Q$ with the axes of the ellipse lie on the circle through $C$ with center $D$, hence $U=A$ and $V=B$, and $|UQ|=a, \quad |VQ|=b\ .$

=== Proof ===
(1): Any ellipse can be represented in a suitable coordinate system parametrically by

$$\vec p(t)= (a\cos t,\; b\sin t)^T$$.
Two points $\vec p(t_1),\ \vec p(t_2)$ lie on conjugate diameters if $t_2-t_1=\pm \tfrac \pi 2\ .$ (see Ellipse: conjugate diameters.)

(2): Let be $Q=(a\cos t,\;b\sin t)$ and

$$P=(a\cos (t+\tfrac \pi 2),\;b\sin (t+\tfrac \pi 2))=(-a\sin t,b\cos t)$$
two points on conjugate diameters.
Then $P'=(b\cos t,a\sin t)$ and the midpoint of line segment $\overline{P'Q}$ is $D=\left(\tfrac{a+b}{2}\cos t, \tfrac{a+b}{2}\sin t\right)$.

(3): Line $P'Q$ has equation $x\sin t+ y\cos t=(a+b)\; \cos t \sin t\ .$

The intersection points of this line with the axes of the ellipse are
$$U=\left(0,\;(a+b)\sin t\right)\ , \quad V=\left((a+b)\cos t,\;0\right)\ .$$

Rytz: left turn of point $P$

(4): Because of $|UD|=|VD|=|CD|$ the points $U,V,C$ lie on the circle with center $D$ and radius $|CD|\ .$

Hence $A=U,\ B=V\ .$

(5): $|UQ|= a, \quad |VQ|= b\ .$

The proof uses a right turn of point $P$, which leads to a diagram showing the 1st paper strip method.

==== Variations ====
If one performs a left turn of point $P$, then results (4) and (5) are still valid and the configuration shows now the 2nd paper strip method (see diagram).
If one uses $P=(a\cos (t{\color{red}-}\tfrac \pi 2),\;b\sin (t{\color{red}-}\tfrac \pi 2))=(a\sin t,-b\cos t)$, then the construction and proof work either.

== Computer aided solution ==
To find the vertices of the ellipse with help of a computer,

- the coordinates of the three points $C,P,Q$ have to be known.

A straight forward idea is: One can write a program that performs the steps described above. A better idea is to use the representation of an arbitrary ellipse parametrically:

- $\vec x = \vec p(t)=\vec f_0+ \vec f_1 \cos t +\vec f_2 \sin t \ .$

With $\vec f_0=\vec{OC}$ (the center) and $\vec f_1=\vec{CP},\; \vec f_2=\vec{CQ}$ (two conjugate half-diameters) one is able to calculate points and to draw the ellipse.

If necessary: With $\cot (2t_0)= \tfrac{\vec f_1^{\, 2}-\vec f_2^{\, 2}}{2\vec f_1 \cdot \vec f_2}$ one gets the four vertices of the ellipse: $\vec p(t_0),\;\vec p(t_0\pm\frac{\pi}{2}),\; \vec p(t_0+\pi) \ .$
