= David Rytz =

Swiss mathematician and teacher

David Rytz von Brugg (1 April 1801, in Bucheggberg – 25 March 1868, in Aarau) was a Swiss mathematician and teacher.

== Life ==
Rytz von Brugg was son of a priest and studied mathematics at Göttingen and Leipzig. He had teaching positions at various cities, one of them 1835 until 1862 at Aarau, where he was „Professor der Mathematik an der Gewerbeschule zu Aarau“.

== Merits ==
Rytz von Brugg is famous for a geometrical method which is known as Rytz’s axis construction. This classical procedure retrieves the semi-axes of an Ellipse from any pair of conjugate diameters. This method is known since 1845, when it was published within a paper by Leopold Moosbrugger.

== Sources ==
- Siegfried Gottwald, Hans-Joachim Ilgauds und Karl-Heinz Schlote, ed. (1990), Lexikon bedeutender Mathematiker (in German), Thun: Verlag Harri Deutsch, p. 407, ISBN 3-8171-1164-9 MR1089881
- Hans Honsberg (1971), Analytische Geometrie: Mit Anhang "Einführung in die Vektorrechnung", Mathematik für Gymnasien (in German) (3. ed.), München: Bayerischer Schulbuch-Verlag, p. 96, ISBN 3-7627-0677-8
- Emil Müller, Erwin Kruppa (1961), Lehrbuch der darstellenden Geometrie: Unveränderter Neudruck der fünften Auflage (in German) (6. ed.), Wien: Springer Verlag, p. 98
- Alexander Ostermann, Gerhard Wanner (2012), Geometry by Its History, Undergraduate Texts in Mathematics. Readings in Mathematics (in German), Heidelberg, New York, Dordrecht, London: Springer Verlag, p. 69, doi:10.1007/978-3-642-29163-0, ISBN 978-3-642-29162-3 MR2918594
- Guido Walz (Red.) (2002), Lexikon der Mathematik in sechs Bänden: Vierter Band (in German), Heidelberg, Berlin: Spektrum Akademischer Verlag, p. 448, ISBN 3-8274-0436-3
