= Conjugate hyperbola =

Symmetric figure defined by a hyperbola

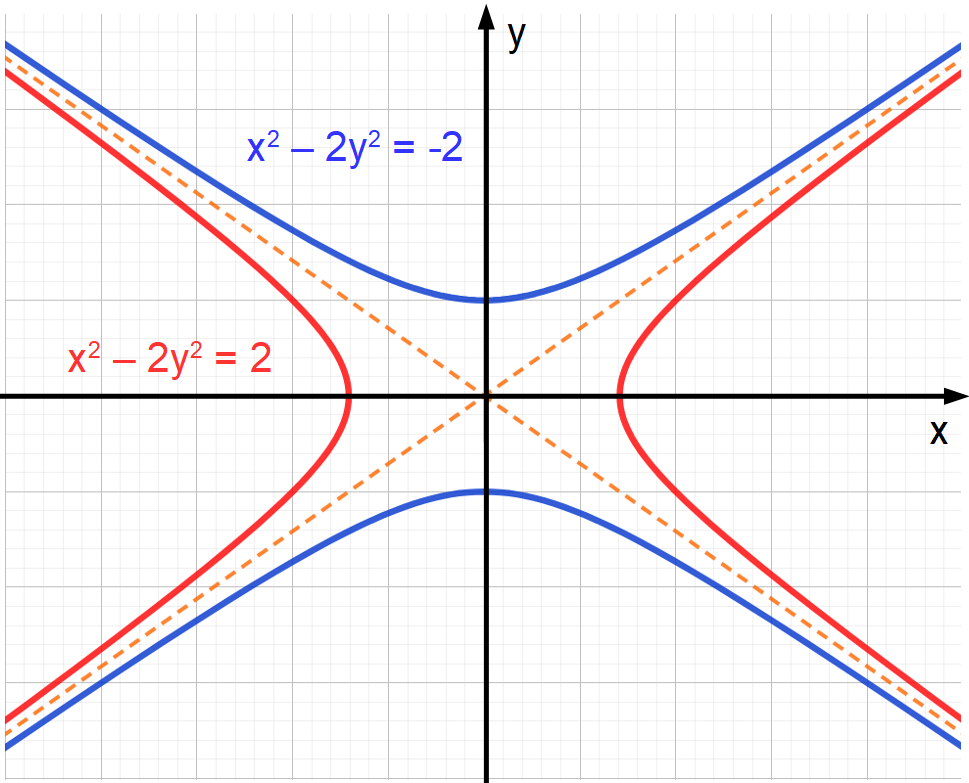
A hyperbola and its conjugate hyperbola

In geometry, a conjugate hyperbola to a given hyperbola shares the same asymptotes but lies in the opposite two sectors of the plane compared to the original hyperbola.

A hyperbola and its conjugate may be constructed as conic sections obtained from an intersecting plane that meets tangent double cones sharing the same apex. Each cone has an axis, and the plane section is parallel to the plane formed by the axes.

Using analytic geometry, the hyperbolas satisfy the symmetric equations

$\frac{x^2}{a^2} - \frac{y^2}{b^2} = 1$, with vertices (a,0) and (–a,0), and
$\frac{x^2}{a^2} - \frac{y^2}{b^2} = -1$ (which can also be written as $\frac{y^2}{b^2} - \frac{x^2}{a^2} = 1$), with vertices (0,b) and (0,–b).

In case a = b they are rectangular hyperbolas, and a reflection of the plane in an asymptote exchanges the conjugates.

Similarly, for a non-zero constant c, the coordinate axes form the asymptotes of the conjugate pair $xy = c^2$ and $xy = -c^2$.

== History ==
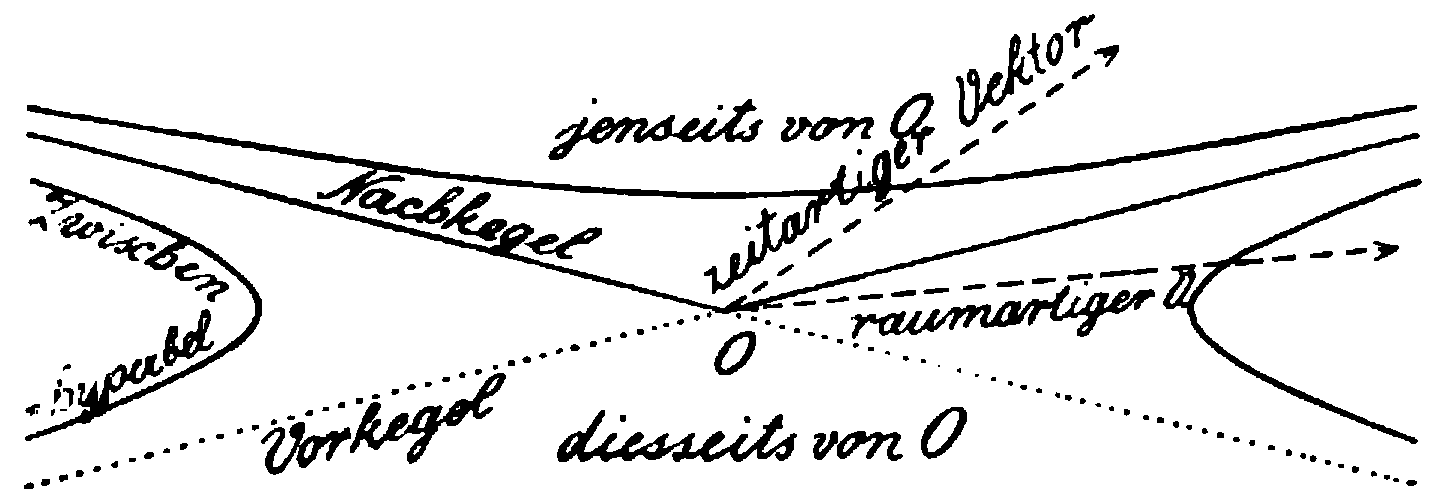
Light cone and conjugate hyperbolas in Minkowski (1908)

Apollonius of Perga introduced the conjugate hyperbola through a geometric construction: "Given two straight lines bisecting one another at any angle, to describe two hyperbolas each with two branches such that the straight lines are conjugate diameters of both hyperbolas." "The two hyperbolas so constructed are called conjugate hyperbolas, and [the] last drawn is the hyperbola conjugate to the first."

The following property was described by Apollonius: let PP', DD' be conjugate diameters of two conjugate hyperbolas, Draw the tangents at P, P', D, D'. Then ... the tangents form a parallelogram, and the diagonals of it, LM, L'M', pass through the center [C]. Also PL = PL' = P'M = P'M' = CD. It is noted that the diagonals of the parallelogram are the asymptotes common to both hyperbolas. Either PP' or DD' is a transverse diameter, with the opposite one being the conjugate diameter.

In 1763 Roger Boscovich sketched conjugate hyperbolas as figure 13 in his illustrations for Theory of Natural Philosophy.

Elements of Dynamic (1878) by W. K. Clifford identifies the conjugate hyperbola.

In 1894 Alexander Macfarlane used an illustration of conjugate right hyperbolas in his study "Principles of elliptic and hyperbolic analysis".

In 1895 W. H. Besant noted conjugate hyperbolas in his book on conic sections.

In his 1896 book on Appolonius cited above, Thomas Heath introduced the configuration of conjugate hyperbolas and their various diameters as follows: "the determination of the conjugate hyperbola with two branches as the complete hyperbola which has a pair of conjugate diameters common with the original hyperbola, with the difference that the secondary diameter of the original hyperbola is the transverse diameter of the conjugate hyperbola, and vice versa."

George Salmon illustrated a conjugate hyperbola as a dotted curve in this Treatise on Conic Sections (1900). Frederick S. Woods and Frederick H. Bailey defined conjugate hyperbolas in their Course of Mathematics (1907).

In 1908 conjugate hyperbolas were used by Hermann Minkowski to demarcate units of duration and distance in a spacetime diagram illustrating a plane in his Minkowski space.

The principle of relativity may be stated as "Any pair of conjugate diameters of conjugate hyperbolas can be taken for the axes of space and time".

In 1957 Barry Spain illustrated conjugate rectangular hyperbolas.
