= Hyperbola =

Plane curve: conic section

A hyperbola is an open curve with two branches, the intersection of a plane with both halves of a double cone. The plane does not have to be parallel to the axis of the cone; the hyperbola will be symmetrical in any case.

Hyperbola (red): features

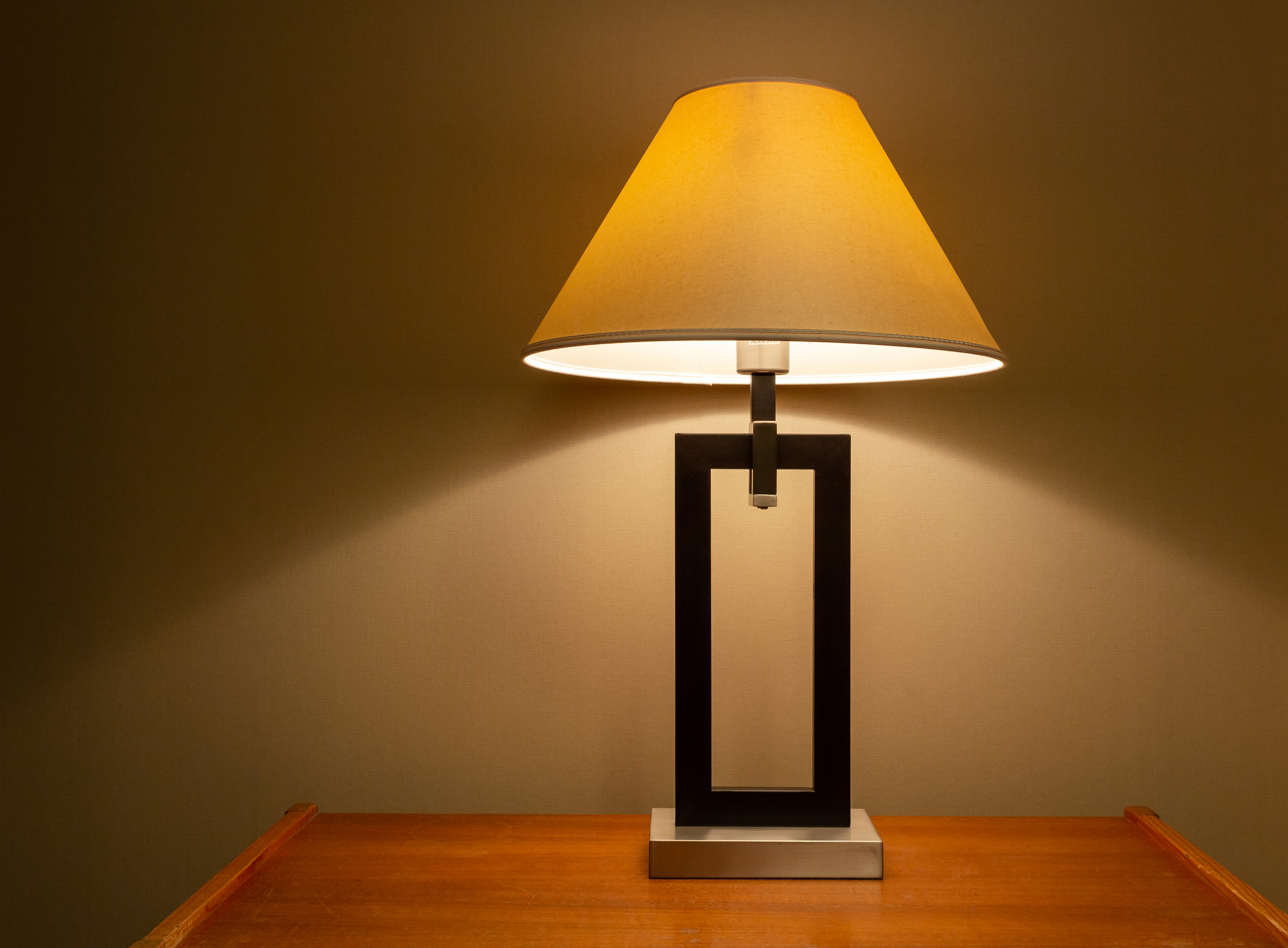
A lampshade with a circular rim casts a hyperbola-shaped shadow on a vertical wall.

In mathematics, a hyperbola (/haɪˈpɜːrbələ/ hy-PUR-bə-lə) is a type of smooth curve lying in a plane, defined by its geometric properties or by equations for which it is the solution set. A hyperbola has two pieces, called connected components or branches, that are mirror images of each other and resemble two infinite bows. The hyperbola is one of the three kinds of conic section, formed by the intersection of a plane and a double cone. (The other conic sections are the parabola and the ellipse, with the circle being a special type of ellipse.) If the plane intersects both halves of the double cone but does not pass through the apex of the cones, then the conic is a hyperbola.

Besides being a conic section, a hyperbola can arise as the locus of points whose difference of distances to two fixed foci is constant, as a curve for each point of which the rays to two fixed foci are reflections across the tangent line at that point, or as the solution of certain bivariate quadratic equations such as the reciprocal relationship $xy = 1.$ In practical applications, a hyperbola can arise as the path followed by the shadow of the tip of a sundial's gnomon, the shape of an open orbit such as that of a celestial object exceeding the escape velocity of the nearest gravitational body, or the scattering trajectory of a subatomic particle, among others.

Each branch of the hyperbola has two arms which become straighter (lower curvature) further out from the center of the hyperbola. Diagonally opposite arms, one from each branch, tend in the limit to a common line, called the asymptote of those two arms. So there are two asymptotes, whose intersection is at the center of symmetry of the hyperbola, which can be thought of as the mirror point about which each branch reflects to form the other branch. In the case of the curve $y(x) = 1/x$ the asymptotes are the two coordinate axes.

Hyperbolas share many of the ellipses' analytical properties such as eccentricity, focus, and directrix. Typically the correspondence can be made with nothing more than a change of sign in some term. Many other mathematical objects have their origin in the hyperbola, such as hyperbolic paraboloids (saddle surfaces), hyperboloids ("wastebaskets"), hyperbolic geometry (Lobachevsky's celebrated non-Euclidean geometry), hyperbolic functions (sinh, cosh, tanh, etc.), and gyrovector spaces (a geometry proposed for use in both relativity and quantum mechanics which is not Euclidean).

== Etymology and history ==
The word "hyperbola" derives from the Greek ὑπερβολή, meaning "over-thrown" or "excessive", from which the English term hyperbole also derives. Hyperbolae were discovered by Menaechmus in his investigations of the problem of doubling the cube, but were then called sections of obtuse cones. The term hyperbola is believed to have been coined by Apollonius of Perga (c. 262 – c. 190 BC) in his definitive work on the conic sections, the Conics. The names of the other two general conic sections, the ellipse and the parabola, derive from the corresponding Greek words for "deficient" and "applied"; all three names are borrowed from earlier Pythagorean terminology which referred to a comparison of the side of rectangles of fixed area with a given line segment. The rectangle could be "applied" to the segment (meaning, have an equal length), be shorter than the segment or exceed the segment.

== Definitions ==
=== As locus of points ===
Hyperbola: definition by the distances of points to two fixed points (foci)

Hyperbola: definition with circular directrix

A hyperbola can be defined geometrically as a set of points (locus of points) in the Euclidean plane:

A hyperbola is a set of points, such that for any point $P$ of the set, the absolute difference of the distances $|PF_1|,\, |PF_2|$ to two fixed points $F_1, F_2$ (the foci) is constant, usually denoted by $2a,\, a>0$:
$$H = \left\{P : \left|\left|PF_2\right| - \left|PF_1\right|\right| = 2a \right\} .$$

The midpoint $M$ of the line segment joining the foci is called the center of the hyperbola. The line through the foci is called the major axis. It contains the vertices $V_1, V_2$, which have distance $a$ to the center. The distance $c$ of the foci to the center is called the focal distance or linear eccentricity. The quotient $\tfrac c a$ is the eccentricity $e$.

The equation $\left|\left|PF_2\right| - \left|PF_1\right|\right| = 2a$ can be viewed in a different way (see diagram):
If $c_2$ is the circle with midpoint $F_2$ and radius $2a$, then the distance of a point $P$ of the right branch to the circle $c_2$ equals the distance to the focus $F_1$:
$$|PF_1|=|Pc_2|.$$
$c_2$ is called the circular directrix (related to focus $F_2$) of the hyperbola. In order to get the left branch of the hyperbola, one has to use the circular directrix related to $F_1$. This property should not be confused with the definition of a hyperbola with help of a directrix (line) below.

=== Hyperbola with equation y = A/x ===
Rotating the coordinate system in order to describe a rectangular hyperbola as graph of a function

Three rectangular hyperbolas $y = A / x$ with the coordinate axes as asymptotes red: A = 1; magenta: A = 4; blue: A = 9

If the xy-coordinate system is rotated about the origin by the angle $+45^\circ$ and new coordinates $\xi,\eta$ are assigned, then $x = \tfrac{\xi+\eta}{\sqrt{2}},\; y = \tfrac{-\xi+\eta}{\sqrt{2}}$.
The rectangular hyperbola $\tfrac{x^2-y^2}{a^2} = 1$ (whose semi-axes are equal) has the new equation $\tfrac{2\xi\eta}{a^2} = 1$. Solving for $\eta$ yields $\eta = \tfrac{a^2/2}{\xi} \ .$

Thus, in an xy-coordinate system the graph of a function $f: x \mapsto \tfrac{A}{x},\; A>0\; ,$ with equation
$$y = \frac{A}{x}\;, A>0\; ,$$
is a rectangular hyperbola entirely in the first and third quadrants with

- the coordinate axes as asymptotes,
- the line $y = x$ as major axis ,
- the center $(0,0)$ and the semi-axis $a = b = \sqrt{2A} \; ,$
- the vertices $\left(\sqrt{A},\sqrt{A}\right), \left(-\sqrt{A},-\sqrt{A}\right) \; ,$
- the semi-latus rectum and radius of curvature at the vertices $p=a=\sqrt{2A} \; ,$
- the linear eccentricity $c=2\sqrt{A}$ and the eccentricity $e=\sqrt{2} \; ,$
- the tangent $y=-\tfrac{A}{x_0^2}x+2\tfrac{A}{x_0}$ at point $(x_0,A/x_0)\; .$

A rotation of the original hyperbola by $-45^\circ$ results in a rectangular hyperbola entirely in the second and fourth quadrants, with the same asymptotes, center, semi-latus rectum, radius of curvature at the vertices, linear eccentricity, and eccentricity as for the case of $+45^\circ$ rotation, with equation
$$y = -\frac{A}{x} \; , ~~ A>0\; ,$$

- the semi-axes $a = b = \sqrt{2A} \; ,$
- the line $y = -x$ as major axis,
- the vertices $\left(-\sqrt{A},\sqrt{A}\right), \left(\sqrt{A},-\sqrt{A}\right) \; .$

Shifting the hyperbola with equation $y=\frac{A}{x}, \ A\ne 0\ ,$ so that the new center is $(c_0,d_0)$, yields the new equation
$$y=\frac{A}{x-c_0}+d_0\; ,$$
and the new asymptotes are $x=c_0$ and $y=d_0$. The shape parameters $a,b,p,c,e$ remain unchanged.

=== By the directrix property ===
Hyperbola: directrix property

Hyperbola: definition with directrix property

The two lines at distance $d = \frac{a^2}c$ from the center and parallel to the minor axis are called directrices of the hyperbola (see diagram).

For an arbitrary point $P$ of the hyperbola the quotient of the distance to one focus and to the corresponding directrix (see diagram) is equal to the eccentricity:
$$\frac{|PF_1|}{|Pl_1|} = \frac{|PF_2|}{|Pl_2|} = e= \frac{c}{a} \, .$$
The proof for the pair $F_1, l_1$ follows from the fact that $|PF_1|^2 = (x-c)^2+y^2,\ |Pl_1|^2 = \left(x-\tfrac{a^2}{c}\right)^2$ and $y^2 = \tfrac{b^2}{a^2}x^2-b^2$ satisfy the equation
$$|PF_1|^2-\frac{c^2}{a^2}|Pl_1|^2 = 0\ .$$
The second case is proven analogously.

Pencil of conics with a common vertex and common semi latus rectum

The inverse statement is also true and can be used to define a hyperbola (in a manner similar to the definition of a parabola):

For any point $F$ (focus), any line $l$ (directrix) not through $F$ and any real number $e$ with $e > 1$ the set of points (locus of points), for which the quotient of the distances to the point and to the line is $e$
$$H = \left\{P \, \Biggr| \, \frac{|PF|}{|Pl|} = e\right\}$$
is a hyperbola.

(The choice $e = 1$ yields a parabola and if $e < 1$ an ellipse.)

==== Proof ====
Let $F=(f,0) ,\ e >0$ and assume $(0,0)$ is a point on the curve. The directrix $l$ has equation $x=-\tfrac{f}{e}$. With $P=(x,y)$, the relation $|PF|^2 = e^2|Pl|^2$ produces the equations

$(x-f)^2+y^2 = e^2\left(x+\tfrac{f}{e}\right)^2 = (e x+f)^2$ and $x^2(e^2-1)+2xf(1+e)-y^2 = 0.$

The substitution $p=f(1+e)$ yields
$$x^2(e^2-1)+2px-y^2 = 0.$$
This is the equation of an ellipse ($e<1$) or a parabola ($e=1$) or a hyperbola ($e>1$). All of these non-degenerate conics have, in common, the origin as a vertex (see diagram).

If $e > 1$, introduce new parameters $a,b$ so that $e^2-1 = \tfrac{b^2}{a^2}, \text { and }\ p = \tfrac{b^2}{a}$, and then the equation above becomes
$$\frac{(x+a)^2}{a^2} - \frac{y^2}{b^2} = 1 \, ,$$
which is the equation of a hyperbola with center $(-a,0)$, the x-axis as major axis and the major/minor semi axis $a,b$.

Hyperbola: construction of a directrix

==== Construction of a directrix ====
Because of $c \cdot \tfrac{a^2}{c}=a^2$ point $L_1$ of directrix $l_1$ (see diagram) and focus $F_1$ are inverse with respect to the circle inversion at circle $x^2+y^2=a^2$ (in diagram green). Hence point $E_1$ can be constructed using the theorem of Thales (not shown in the diagram). The directrix $l_1$ is the perpendicular to line $\overline{F_1F_2}$ through point $E_1$.

Alternative construction of $E_1$: Calculation shows, that point $E_1$ is the intersection of the asymptote with its perpendicular through $F_1$ (see diagram).

=== As plane section of a cone ===
Hyperbola (red): two views of a cone and two Dandelin spheres d_{1}, d_{2}

The intersection of an upright double cone by a plane not through the vertex with slope greater than the slope of the lines on the cone is a hyperbola (see diagram: red curve). In order to prove the defining property of a hyperbola (see above) one uses two Dandelin spheres $d_1, d_2$, which are spheres that touch the cone along circles $c_1$, $c_2$ and the intersecting (hyperbola) plane at points $F_1$ and $F_2$. It turns out: $F_1, F_2$ are the foci of the hyperbola.

1. Let $P$ be an arbitrary point of the intersection curve.
2. The generatrix of the cone containing $P$ intersects circle $c_1$ at point $A$ and circle $c_2$ at a point $B$.
3. The line segments $\overline{PF_1}$ and $\overline{PA}$ are tangential to the sphere $d_1$ and, hence, are of equal length.
4. The line segments $\overline{PF_2}$ and $\overline{PB}$ are tangential to the sphere $d_2$ and, hence, are of equal length.
5. The result is: $|PF_1| - |PF_2| = |PA| - |PB| = |AB|$ is independent of the hyperbola point $P$, because no matter where point $P$ is, $A, B$ have to be on circles $c_1$, $c_2$, and line segment $AB$ has to cross the apex. Therefore, as point $P$ moves along the red curve (hyperbola), line segment $\overline{AB}$ simply rotates about apex without changing its length.

=== Pin and string construction ===
Hyperbola: Pin and string construction

The definition of a hyperbola by its foci and its circular directrices (see above) can be used for drawing an arc of it with help of pins, a string and a ruler:

0. Choose the foci $F_1,F_2$ and one of the circular directrices, for example $c_2$ (circle with radius $2a$)
1. A ruler is fixed at point $F_2$ free to rotate around $F_2$. Point $B$ is marked at distance $2a$.
2. A string gets its one end pinned at point $A$ on the ruler and its length is made $|AB|$.
3. The free end of the string is pinned to point $F_1$.
4. Take a pen and hold the string tight to the edge of the ruler.
5. Rotating the ruler around $F_2$ prompts the pen to draw an arc of the right branch of the hyperbola, because of $|PF_1| = |PB|$ (see the definition of a hyperbola by circular directrices).

=== Steiner generation of a hyperbola ===
Hyperbola: Steiner generation

Hyperbola y = 1/x: Steiner generation

The following method to construct single points of a hyperbola relies on the Steiner generation of a non degenerate conic section:

Given two pencils $B(U),B(V)$ of lines at two points $U,V$ (all lines containing $U$ and $V$, respectively) and a projective but not perspective mapping $\pi$ of $B(U)$ onto $B(V)$, then the intersection points of corresponding lines form a non-degenerate projective conic section.

For the generation of points of the hyperbola $\tfrac{x^2}{a^2}-\tfrac{y^2}{b^2} = 1$ one uses the pencils at the vertices $V_1,V_2$. Let $P = (x_0,y_0)$ be a point of the hyperbola and $A = (a,y_0), B = (x_0,0)$. The line segment $\overline{BP}$ is divided into n equally-spaced segments and this division is projected parallel with the diagonal $AB$ as direction onto the line segment $\overline{AP}$ (see diagram). The parallel projection is part of the projective mapping between the pencils at $V_1$ and $V_2$ needed. The intersection points of any two related lines $S_1 A_i$ and $S_2 B_i$ are points of the uniquely defined hyperbola.

Remarks:

- The subdivision could be extended beyond the points $A$ and $B$ in order to get more points, but the determination of the intersection points would become more inaccurate. A better idea is extending the points already constructed by symmetry (see animation).
- The Steiner generation exists for ellipses and parabolas, too.
- The Steiner generation is sometimes called a parallelogram method because one can use other points rather than the vertices, which starts with a parallelogram instead of a rectangle.

=== Inscribed angles for hyperbolas y = a/(x − b) + c and the 3-point-form ===
Hyperbola: inscribed angle theorem

A hyperbola with equation $y=\tfrac{a}{x-b}+c,\ a \ne 0$ is uniquely determined by three points $(x_1,y_1),\;(x_2,y_2),\; (x_3,y_3)$ with different x- and y-coordinates. A simple way to determine the shape parameters $a,b,c$ uses the inscribed angle theorem for hyperbolas:

In order to measure an angle between two lines with equations $y=m_1x+d_1, \ y=m_2x + d_2\ ,m_1,m_2 \ne 0$ in this context one uses the quotient
$$\frac{m_1}{m_2}\ .$$

Analogous to the inscribed angle theorem for circles one gets the

Inscribed angle theorem for hyperbolas—For four points $P_i = (x_i,y_i),\ i=1,2,3,4,\ x_i\ne x_k, y_i\ne y_k, i\ne k$ (see diagram) the following statement is true:

The four points are on a hyperbola with equation $y = \tfrac{a}{x-b} + c$ if and only if the angles at $P_3$ and $P_4$ are equal in the sense of the measurement above. That means if
$$\frac{(y_4-y_1)}{(x_4-x_1)}\frac{(x_4-x_2)}{(y_4-y_2)}=\frac{(y_3-y_1)}{(x_3-x_1)}\frac{(x_3-x_2)}{(y_3-y_2)}$$

The proof can be derived by straightforward calculation. If the points are on a hyperbola, one can assume the hyperbola's equation is $y = a/x$.

A consequence of the inscribed angle theorem for hyperbolas is the

3-point-form of a hyperbola's equation—The equation of the hyperbola determined by 3 points $P_i=(x_i,y_i),\ i=1,2,3,\ x_i\ne x_k, y_i\ne y_k, i\ne k$ is the solution of the equation
$$\frac{({\color{red}y}-y_1)}{({\color{green}x}-x_1)}\frac{({\color{green}x}-x_2)}{({\color{red}y}-y_2)}=\frac{(y_3-y_1)}{(x_3-x_1)}\frac{(x_3-x_2)}{(y_3-y_2)}$$
for ${\color{red}y}$.

=== As an affine image of the unit hyperbola x^{2} − y^{2} = 1 ===
Any hyperbola is the image of the unit hyperbola under some affine transformation.

Another definition of a hyperbola uses affine transformations:

Any hyperbola is the affine image of the unit hyperbola with equation $x^2 - y^2 = 1$.

==== Parametric representation ====
An affine transformation of the Euclidean plane has the form $\vec x \to \vec f_0+A\vec x$, where $A$ is a regular matrix (its determinant is not 0) and $\vec f_0$ is an arbitrary vector. If $\vec f_1, \vec f_2$ are the column vectors of the matrix $A$, the unit hyperbola $(\pm\cosh(t),\sinh(t)), t \in \R,$ is mapped onto the hyperbola

$$\vec x = \vec p(t)=\vec f_0 \pm\vec f_1 \cosh t +\vec f_2 \sinh t \ .$$

$\vec f_0$ is the center, $\vec f_0+ \vec f_1$ a point of the hyperbola and $\vec f_2$ a tangent vector at this point.

==== Vertices ====
In general the vectors $\vec f_1, \vec f_2$ are not perpendicular. That means, in general $\vec f_0\pm \vec f_1$ are not the vertices of the hyperbola. But $\vec f_1\pm \vec f_2$ point into the directions of the asymptotes. The tangent vector at point $\vec p(t)$ is
$$\vec p'(t) = \vec f_1\sinh t + \vec f_2\cosh t \ .$$
Because at a vertex the tangent is perpendicular to the major axis of the hyperbola one gets the parameter $t_0$ of a vertex from the equation
$$\vec p'(t)\cdot \left(\vec p(t) -\vec f_0\right) = \left(\vec f_1\sinh t + \vec f_2\cosh t\right) \cdot \left(\vec f_1 \cosh t +\vec f_2 \sinh t\right) = 0$$
and hence from
$$\coth (2t_0)= -\tfrac{\vec f_1^{\, 2}+\vec f_2^{\, 2}}{2\vec f_1 \cdot \vec f_2} \ ,$$
which yields

$$t_0=\tfrac{1}{4}\ln\tfrac{\left(\vec f_1-\vec f_2\right)^2}{\left(\vec f_1+\vec f_2\right)^2}.$$

The formulae $\cosh^2 x + \sinh^2 x = \cosh 2x$, $2\sinh x \cosh x = \sinh 2x$, and $\operatorname{arcoth} x = \tfrac{1}{2}\ln\tfrac{x+1}{x-1}$ were used.

The two vertices of the hyperbola are $\vec f_0\pm\left(\vec f_1\cosh t_0 +\vec f_2 \sinh t_0\right).$

==== Implicit representation ====
Solving the parametric representation for $\cosh t, \sinh t$ by Cramer's rule and using $\;\cosh^2t-\sinh^2t -1 = 0\;$, one gets the implicit representation
$$\det\left(\vec x\!-\!\vec f\!_0,\vec f\!_2\right)^2 - \det\left(\vec f\!_1,\vec x\!-\!\vec f\!_0\right)^2 - \det\left(\vec f\!_1,\vec f\!_2\right)^2 = 0 .$$

==== Hyperbola in space ====
The definition of a hyperbola in this section gives a parametric representation of an arbitrary hyperbola, even in space, if one allows $\vec f\!_0, \vec f\!_1, \vec f\!_2$ to be vectors in space.

=== As an affine image of the hyperbola y = 1/x ===
Hyperbola as affine image of y = 1/x

Because the unit hyperbola $x^2-y^2=1$ is affinely equivalent to the hyperbola $y=1/x$, an arbitrary hyperbola can be considered as the affine image (see previous section) of the hyperbola $y = 1/x \,$:

$$\vec x = \vec p(t) = \vec f_0 + \vec f_1 t + \vec f_2 \tfrac{1}{t}, \quad t\ne 0\, .$$

$M: \vec f_0$ is the center of the hyperbola, the vectors $\vec f_1 , \vec f_2$ have the directions of the asymptotes and $\vec f_1 + \vec f_2$ is a point of the hyperbola. The tangent vector is
$$\vec p'(t)=\vec f_1 - \vec f_2 \tfrac{1}{t^2}.$$
At a vertex the tangent is perpendicular to the major axis. Hence
$$\vec p'(t)\cdot \left(\vec p(t) -\vec f_0\right) = \left(\vec f_1 - \vec f_2 \tfrac{1}{t^2}\right)\cdot\left(\vec f_1 t+ \vec f_2 \tfrac{1}{t}\right) = \vec f_1^2t-\vec f_2^2 \tfrac{1}{t^3} = 0$$
and the parameter of a vertex is

$$t_0= \pm \sqrt[4]{\frac{\vec f_2^2}{\vec f_1^2}}.$$

$\left|\vec f\!_1\right| = \left|\vec f\!_2\right|$ is equivalent to $t_0 = \pm 1$ and $\vec f_0 \pm (\vec f_1+\vec f_2)$ are the vertices of the hyperbola.

The following properties of a hyperbola are easily proven using the representation of a hyperbola introduced in this section.

==== Tangent construction ====
Tangent construction: asymptotes and P given → tangent

The tangent vector can be rewritten by factorization:
$$\vec p'(t)=\tfrac{1}{t}\left(\vec f_1t - \vec f_2 \tfrac{1}{t}\right) \ .$$
This means that

the diagonal $AB$ of the parallelogram $M: \ \vec f_0, \ A=\vec f_0+\vec f_1t,\ B:\ \vec f_0+ \vec f_2 \tfrac{1}{t},\ P:\ \vec f_0+\vec f_1t+\vec f_2 \tfrac{1}{t}$ is parallel to the tangent at the hyperbola point $P$ (see diagram).

This property provides a way to construct the tangent at a point on the hyperbola.

This property of a hyperbola is an affine version of the 3-point-degeneration of Pascal's theorem.

Area of the grey parallelogram

The area of the grey parallelogram $MAPB$ in the above diagram is
$$\text{Area} = \left|\det\left( t\vec f_1, \tfrac{1}{t}\vec f_2\right)\right| = \left|\det\left(\vec f_1,\vec f_2\right)\right| = \cdots = \frac{ab}{2}$$
and hence independent of point $P$. The last equation follows from a calculation for the case, where $P$ is a vertex and the hyperbola in its canonical form $\tfrac{x^2}{a^2}-\tfrac{y^2}{b^2}=1 \, .$

==== Point construction ====
Point construction: asymptotes and P_{1} are given → P_{2}

For a hyperbola with parametric representation $\vec x = \vec p(t) = \vec f_1 t + \vec f_2 \tfrac{1}{t}$ (for simplicity the center is the origin) the following is true:

For any two points $P_1:\ \vec f_1 t_1+ \vec f_2 \tfrac{1}{t_1},\ P_2:\ \vec f_1 t_2+ \vec f_2 \tfrac{1}{t_2}$ the points

$$A:\ \vec a =\vec f_1 t_1+ \vec f_2 \tfrac{1}{t_2}, \ B:\ \vec b=\vec f_1 t_2+ \vec f_2 \tfrac{1}{t_1}$$

are collinear with the center of the hyperbola (see diagram).

The simple proof is a consequence of the equation $\tfrac{1}{t_1}\vec a = \tfrac{1}{t_2}\vec b$.

This property provides a possibility to construct points of a hyperbola if the asymptotes and one point are given.

This property of a hyperbola is an affine version of the 4-point-degeneration of Pascal's theorem.

==== Tangent–asymptotes triangle ====
Hyperbola: tangent-asymptotes-triangle

For simplicity the center of the hyperbola may be the origin and the vectors $\vec f_1,\vec f_2$ have equal length. If the last assumption is not fulfilled one can first apply a parameter transformation (see above) in order to make the assumption true. Hence $\pm (\vec f_1 + \vec f_2)$ are the vertices, $\pm(\vec f_1-\vec f_2)$ span the minor axis and one gets $|\vec f_1 + \vec f_2| = a$ and $|\vec f_1 - \vec f_2| = b$.

For the intersection points of the tangent at point $\vec p(t_0) = \vec f_1 t_0 + \vec f_2 \tfrac{1}{t_0}$ with the asymptotes one gets the points
$$C = 2t_0\vec f_1,\ D = \tfrac{2}{t_0}\vec f_2.$$
The area of the triangle $M,C,D$ can be calculated by a 2 × 2 determinant:
$$A = \tfrac{1}{2}\Big|\det\left( 2t_0\vec f_1, \tfrac{2}{t_0}\vec f_2\right)\Big| = 2\Big|\det\left(\vec f_1,\vec f_2\right)\Big|$$
(see rules for determinants). $\left|\det(\vec f_1,\vec f_2)\right|$ is the area of the rhombus generated by $\vec f_1,\vec f_2$. The area of a rhombus is equal to one half of the product of its diagonals. The diagonals are the semi-axes $a,b$ of the hyperbola. Hence:

The area of the triangle $MCD$ is independent of the point of the hyperbola: $A = ab.$

=== Reciprocation of a circle ===
The reciprocation of a circle B in a circle C always yields a conic section such as a hyperbola. The process of "reciprocation in a circle C" consists of replacing every line and point in a geometrical figure with their corresponding pole and polar, respectively. The pole of a line is the inversion of its closest point to the circle C, whereas the polar of a point is the converse, namely, a line whose closest point to C is the inversion of the point.

The eccentricity of the conic section obtained by reciprocation is the ratio of the distances between the two circles' centers to the radius r of reciprocation circle C. If B and C represent the points at the centers of the corresponding circles, then

$$e = \frac{\overline{BC}}{r}.$$

Since the eccentricity of a hyperbola is always greater than one, the center B must lie outside of the reciprocating circle C.

This definition implies that the hyperbola is both the locus of the poles of the tangent lines to the circle B, as well as the envelope of the polar lines of the points on B. Conversely, the circle B is the envelope of polars of points on the hyperbola, and the locus of poles of tangent lines to the hyperbola. Two tangent lines to B have no (finite) poles because they pass through the center C of the reciprocation circle C; the polars of the corresponding tangent points on B are the asymptotes of the hyperbola. The two branches of the hyperbola correspond to the two parts of the circle B that are separated by these tangent points.

=== Quadratic equation ===
A hyperbola can also be defined as a second-degree equation in the Cartesian coordinates $(x, y)$ in the plane,

$$A_{xx} x^2 + 2 A_{xy} xy + A_{yy} y^2 + 2 B_x x + 2 B_y y + C = 0,$$

provided that the constants $A_{xx},$ $A_{xy},$ $A_{yy},$ $B_x,$ $B_y,$ and $C$ satisfy the determinant condition

$$D := \begin{vmatrix}
A_{xx} & A_{xy} \\
A_{xy} & A_{yy} \end{vmatrix} < 0.$$

This determinant is conventionally called the discriminant of the conic section.

A special case of a hyperbola—the degenerate hyperbola consisting of two intersecting lines—occurs when another determinant is zero:

$$\Delta := \begin{vmatrix}
A_{xx} & A_{xy} & B_x \\
A_{xy} & A_{yy} & B_y \\
B_x & B_y & C
\end{vmatrix} = 0.$$

This determinant $\Delta$ is sometimes called the discriminant of the conic section.

The general equation's coefficients can be obtained from known semi-major axis $a,$ semi-minor axis $b,$ center coordinates $(x_\circ, y_\circ)$, and rotation angle $\theta$ (the angle from the positive horizontal axis to the hyperbola's major axis) using the formulae:

$$\begin{align}
A_{xx} &=   -a^2 \sin^2\theta + b^2 \cos^2\theta, &
B_{x} &= -A_{xx} x_\circ   -  A_{xy} y_\circ, \\[1ex]
A_{yy} &=   -a^2 \cos^2\theta + b^2 \sin^2\theta, &
B_{y} &= - A_{xy} x_\circ   - A_{yy} y_\circ, \\[1ex]
A_{xy} &=  \left(a^2 + b^2\right) \sin\theta \cos\theta, &
C &=   A_{xx} x_\circ^2 +  2A_{xy} x_\circ y_\circ + A_{yy} y_\circ^2 - a^2 b^2.
\end{align}$$

These expressions can be derived from the canonical equation

$$\frac{X^2}{a^2} - \frac{Y^2}{b^2} = 1$$

by a translation and rotation of the coordinates $(x, y)$:

$$\begin{alignat}{2}
X &= \phantom+\left(x - x_\circ\right) \cos\theta &&+ \left(y - y_\circ\right) \sin\theta, \\
Y &=         -\left(x - x_\circ\right) \sin\theta &&+ \left(y - y_\circ\right) \cos\theta.
\end{alignat}$$

Given the above general parametrization of the hyperbola in Cartesian coordinates, the eccentricity can be found using the formula in Conic section#Eccentricity in terms of coefficients.

The center $(x_c, y_c)$ of the hyperbola may be determined from the formulae

$$\begin{align}
x_c &= -\frac{1}{D} \, \begin{vmatrix} B_x & A_{xy} \\ B_y & A_{yy} \end{vmatrix} \,, \\[1ex]
y_c &= -\frac{1}{D} \, \begin{vmatrix} A_{xx} & B_x \\ A_{xy} & B_y \end{vmatrix} \,.
\end{align}$$

In terms of new coordinates, $\xi = x - x_c$ and $\eta = y - y_c,$ the defining equation of the hyperbola can be written

$$A_{xx} \xi^2 + 2A_{xy} \xi\eta + A_{yy} \eta^2 + \frac \Delta D = 0.$$

The principal axes of the hyperbola make an angle $\varphi$ with the positive $x$-axis that is given by

$$\tan (2\varphi) = \frac{2A_{xy}}{A_{xx} - A_{yy}}.$$

Rotating the coordinate axes so that the $x$-axis is aligned with the transverse axis brings the equation into its canonical form

$$\frac{x^2}{a^2} - \frac{y^2}{b^2} = 1.$$

The major and minor semiaxes $a$ and $b$ are defined by the equations
$$\begin{align}
a^2 &= -\frac{\Delta}{\lambda_1 D} = -\frac{\Delta}{\lambda_1^2 \lambda_2}, \\[1ex]
b^2 &= -\frac{\Delta}{\lambda_2 D} = -\frac{\Delta}{\lambda_1 \lambda_2^2},
\end{align}$$

where $\lambda_1$ and $\lambda_2$ are the roots of the quadratic equation

$$\lambda^2 - \left( A_{xx} + A_{yy} \right)\lambda + D = 0.$$

For comparison, the corresponding equation for a degenerate hyperbola (consisting of two intersecting lines) is

$$\frac{x^2}{a^2} - \frac{y^2}{b^2} = 0.$$

The tangent line to a given point $(x_0, y_0)$ on the hyperbola is defined by the equation

$$E x + F y + G = 0$$

where $E,$ $F,$ and $G$ are defined by

$$\begin{align}
E &= A_{xx} x_0 + A_{xy} y_0 + B_x, \\[1ex]
F &= A_{xy} x_0 + A_{yy} y_0 + B_y, \\[1ex]
G &= B_x x_0 + B_y y_0 + C.
\end{align}$$

The normal line to the hyperbola at the same point is given by the equation

$$F(x - x_0) - E(y - y_0) = 0.$$

The normal line is perpendicular to the tangent line, and both pass through the same point $(x_0, y_0).$

From the equation

$$\frac{x^2}{a^2} - \frac{y^2}{b^2} = 1, \qquad 0 < b \leq a,$$

the left focus is $(-ae,0)$ and the right focus is $(ae,0),$ where $e$ is the eccentricity. Denote the distances from a point $(x, y)$ to the left and right foci as $r_1$ and $r_2.$ For a point on the right branch,

$$r_1 - r_2 = 2 a,$$

and for a point on the left branch,

$$r_2 - r_1 = 2 a.$$

This can be proved as follows:

If $(x, y)$ is a point on the hyperbola the distance to the left focal point is

$$r_1^2
= (x+a e)^2 + y^2
= x^2 + 2 x a e + a^2 e^2 + \left(x^2-a^2\right) \left(e^2-1\right)
= (e x + a)^2.$$

To the right focal point the distance is

$$r_2^2
= (x-a e)^2 + y^2
= x^2 - 2 x a e + a^2 e^2 + \left(x^2-a^2\right) \left(e^2-1\right)
= (e x - a)^2.$$

If $(x, y)$ is a point on the right branch of the hyperbola then $ex > a$ and

$$\begin{align}
r_1 &= e x + a, \\
r_2 &= e x - a.
\end{align}$$

Subtracting these equations one gets

$$r_1 - r_2 = 2a.$$

If $(x, y)$ is a point on the left branch of the hyperbola then $ex < -a$ and

$$\begin{align}
r_1 &= - e x - a, \\
r_2 &= - e x + a.
\end{align}$$

Subtracting these equations one gets

$$r_2 - r_1 = 2a.$$

== In Cartesian coordinates ==
=== Equation ===
If Cartesian coordinates are introduced such that the origin is the center of the hyperbola and the x-axis is the major axis, then the hyperbola is called east-west-opening and

the foci are the points $F_1=(c,0),\ F_2=(-c,0)$,
the vertices are $V_1=(a, 0),\ V_2=(-a,0)$.

For an arbitrary point $(x,y)$ the distance to the focus $(c,0)$ is $\sqrt{(x-c)^2 + y^2}$ and to the second focus $\sqrt{(x+c)^2 + y^2}$. Hence the point $(x,y)$ is on the hyperbola if the following condition is fulfilled
$$\sqrt{(x-c)^2 + y^2} - \sqrt{(x+c)^2 + y^2} = \pm 2a \ .$$
Remove the square roots by suitable squarings and use the relation $b^2 = c^2-a^2$ to obtain the equation of the hyperbola:

$$\frac{x^2}{a^2} - \frac{y^2}{b^2} = 1 \ .$$

This equation is called the canonical form of a hyperbola, because any hyperbola, regardless of its orientation relative to the Cartesian axes and regardless of the location of its center, can be transformed to this form by a change of variables, giving a hyperbola that is congruent to the original (see below).

The axes of symmetry or principal axes are the transverse axis (containing the segment of length 2a with endpoints at the vertices) and the conjugate axis (containing the segment of length 2b perpendicular to the transverse axis and with midpoint at the hyperbola's center). As opposed to an ellipse, a hyperbola has only two vertices: $(a,0),\; (-a,0)$. The two points $(0,b),\; (0,-b)$ on the conjugate axes are not on the hyperbola.

It follows from the equation that the hyperbola is symmetric with respect to both of the coordinate axes and hence symmetric with respect to the origin.

==== Eccentricity ====
For a hyperbola in the above canonical form, the eccentricity is given by

$$e=\sqrt{1+\frac{b^2}{a^2}}.$$

Two hyperbolas are geometrically similar to each other – meaning that they have the same shape, so that one can be transformed into the other by rigid left and right movements, rotation, taking a mirror image, and scaling (magnification) – if and only if they have the same eccentricity.

=== Asymptotes ===
Hyperbola: semi-axes a,b, linear eccentricity c, semi latus rectum p

Hyperbola: 3 properties

Solving the equation (above) of the hyperbola for $y$ yields
$$y=\pm\frac{b}{a} \sqrt{x^2-a^2}.$$
It follows from this that the hyperbola approaches the two lines
$$y=\pm \frac{b}{a}x$$
for large values of $|x|$. These two lines intersect at the center (origin) and are called asymptotes of the hyperbola $\tfrac{x^2}{a^2}-\tfrac{y^2}{b^2}= 1 \ .$

With the help of the second figure one can see that

${\color{blue}{(1)}}$ The perpendicular distance from a focus to either asymptote is $b$ (the semi-minor axis).

From the Hesse normal form $\tfrac{bx\pm ay}{\sqrt{a^2+b^2}}=0$ of the asymptotes and the equation of the hyperbola one gets:

${\color{magenta}{(2)}}$ The product of the distances from a point on the hyperbola to both the asymptotes is the constant $\tfrac{a^2b^2}{a^2+b^2}\ ,$ which can also be written in terms of the eccentricity e as $\left( \tfrac{b}{e}\right) ^2.$

From the equation $y=\pm\frac{b}{a}\sqrt{x^2-a^2}$ of the hyperbola (above) one can derive:

${\color{green}{(3)}}$ The product of the slopes of lines from a point P to the two vertices is the constant $b^2/a^2\ .$

In addition, from (2) above it can be shown that

${\color{red}{(4)}}$ The product of the distances from a point on the hyperbola to the asymptotes along lines parallel to the asymptotes is the constant $\tfrac{a^2+b^2}{4}.$

=== Semi-latus rectum ===
The length of the chord through one of the foci, perpendicular to the major axis of the hyperbola, is called the latus rectum. One half of it is the semi-latus rectum $p$. A calculation shows
$$p = \frac{b^2}a.$$
The semi-latus rectum $p$ may also be viewed as the radius of curvature at the vertices.

=== Tangent ===
The simplest way to determine the equation of the tangent at a point $(x_0,y_0)$ is to implicitly differentiate the equation $\tfrac{x^2}{a^2}-\tfrac{y^2}{b^2}= 1$ of the hyperbola. Denoting dy/dx as y′, this produces
$$\frac{2x}{a^2}-\frac{2yy'}{b^2}= 0 \ \Rightarrow \ y'=\frac{x}{y}\frac{b^2}{a^2}\ \Rightarrow \ y=\frac{x_0}{y_0}\frac{b^2}{a^2}(x-x_0) +y_0.$$
With respect to $\tfrac{x_0^2}{a^2}-\tfrac{y_0^2}{b^2}= 1$, the equation of the tangent at point $(x_0,y_0)$ is
$$\frac{x_0}{a^2}x-\frac{y_0}{b^2}y = 1.$$

A particular tangent line distinguishes the hyperbola from the other conic sections. Let f be the distance from the vertex V (on both the hyperbola and its axis through the two foci) to the nearer focus. Then the distance, along a line perpendicular to that axis, from that focus to a point P on the hyperbola is greater than 2f. The tangent to the hyperbola at P intersects that axis at point Q at an angle ∠PQV of greater than 45°.

=== Rectangular hyperbola ===
In the case $a = b$ the hyperbola is called rectangular (or equilateral), because its asymptotes intersect at right angles. For this case, the linear eccentricity is $c=\sqrt{2}a$, the eccentricity $e=\sqrt{2}$ and the semi-latus rectum $p=a$. The graph of the equation $y=1/x$ is a rectangular hyperbola.

=== Parametric representation with hyperbolic sine/cosine ===
Using the hyperbolic sine and cosine functions $\cosh,\sinh$, a parametric representation of the hyperbola $\tfrac{x^2}{a^2}-\tfrac{y^2}{b^2}= 1$ can be obtained, which is similar to the parametric representation of an ellipse:
$$(\pm a \cosh t, b \sinh t),\, t \in \R \ ,$$
which satisfies the Cartesian equation because $\cosh^2 t -\sinh^2 t =1 .$

Further parametric representations are given in the section Parametric equations below.

Here a = b = 1 giving the unit hyperbola in blue and its conjugate hyperbola in green, sharing the same red asymptotes.

=== Conjugate hyperbola ===
For the hyperbola $\frac{x^2}{a^2} - \frac{y^2}{b^2} = 1$, change the sign on the right to obtain the equation of the conjugate hyperbola:

$\frac{x^2}{a^2}-\frac{y^2}{b^2} = -1$ or equivalently:$\frac{y^2}{b^2}-\frac{x^2}{a^2} = 1$

A hyperbola and its conjugate may have diameters which are conjugate. In the theory of special relativity, such diameters may represent axes of time and space, where one hyperbola represents events at a given spatial distance from the center, and the other represents events at a corresponding temporal distance from the center.

Alternatively, $xy = c^2$ and $xy = -c^2$ also specify a pair of conjugate hyperbolas.

== In polar coordinates ==
Hyperbola: Polar coordinates with pole = focus

Hyperbola: Polar coordinates with pole = center

Animated plot of Hyperbola by using $r = \frac{p}{1 - e \cos \theta}$

=== Origin at the focus ===
The polar coordinates used most commonly for the hyperbola are defined relative to the Cartesian coordinate system that has its origin in a focus and its x-axis pointing toward the origin of the "canonical coordinate system" as illustrated in the first diagram.

In this case the angle $\varphi$ is called true anomaly.

Relative to this coordinate system one has that

$$r = \frac{p}{1 \mp e \cos \varphi}, \quad p = \frac{b^2}{a}$$

and

$$-\arccos \left(-\frac 1 e\right) < \varphi < \arccos \left(-\frac 1 e\right).$$

=== Origin at the center ===
With polar coordinates relative to the "canonical coordinate system" (see second diagram) one has that

$$r =\frac{b}{\sqrt{e^2 \cos^2 \varphi -1}} .\,$$

For the right branch of the hyperbola the range of $\varphi$ is
$$-\arccos \left(\frac 1 e\right) < \varphi < \arccos \left(\frac 1 e\right).$$

=== Eccentricity ===
When using polar coordinates, the eccentricity of the hyperbola can be expressed as $\sec\varphi_\text{max}$ where $\varphi_\text{max}$ is the limit of the angular coordinate. As $\varphi$ approaches this limit, r approaches infinity and the denominator in either of the equations noted above approaches zero, hence:

$$e^2 \cos^2 \varphi_\text{max} - 1 = 0$$

$$1 \pm e \cos \varphi_\text{max} = 0$$

$$\implies e = \sec\varphi_\text{max}$$

== Parametric equations ==
A hyperbola with equation $\tfrac{x^2}{a^2} - \tfrac{y^2}{b^2} = 1$ can be described by several parametric equations:

1. Through hyperbolic trigonometric functions
  $$\begin{cases}
x = \pm a \cosh t, \\
y = b \sinh t,
\end{cases} \qquad t \in \R.$$
2. As a rational representation
  $$\begin{cases}
x = \pm a \dfrac{t^2 + 1}{2t}, \\[1ex]
y = b \dfrac{t^2 - 1}{2t},
\end{cases} \qquad t > 0$$
3. Through circular trigonometric functions
  $$\begin{cases}
x = \frac{a}{\cos t} = a \sec t, \\
y = \pm b \tan t,
\end{cases} \qquad 0 \le t < 2\pi,\ t \ne \frac{\pi}{2},\ t \ne \frac{3}{2} \pi.$$
4. With the tangent slope as parameter:
  A parametric representation, which uses the slope $m$ of the tangent at a point of the hyperbola can be obtained analogously to the ellipse case: Replace in the ellipse case $b^2$ by $-b^2$ and use formulae for the hyperbolic functions. One gets
  $$\vec c_\pm(m) = \left(-\frac{ma^2}{\pm\sqrt{m^2a^2 - b^2}}, \frac{-b^2}{\pm\sqrt{m^2a^2 - b^2}}\right),\quad |m| > b/a.$$
  Here, $\vec c_-$ is the upper, and $\vec c_+$ the lower half of the hyperbola. The points with vertical tangents (vertices $(\pm a, 0)$) are not covered by the representation.
  The equation of the tangent at point $\vec c_\pm(m)$ is
  $$y = m x \pm\sqrt{m^2a^2 - b^2}.$$
  This description of the tangents of a hyperbola is an essential tool for the determination of the orthoptic of a hyperbola.

== Hyperbolic functions ==
A ray through the unit hyperbola $x^2\ -\ y^2\ =\ 1$ at the point $(\cosh\,a,\,\sinh\,a)$, where $a$ is twice the area between the ray, the hyperbola, and the $x$-axis. For points on the hyperbola below the $x$-axis, the area is considered negative.

Just as the trigonometric functions are defined in terms of the unit circle, so also the hyperbolic functions are defined in terms of the unit hyperbola, as shown in this diagram. In a unit circle, the angle (in radians) is equal to twice the area of the circular sector which that angle subtends. The analogous hyperbolic angle is likewise defined as twice the area of a hyperbolic sector.

Let $a$ be twice the area between the $x$ axis and a ray through the origin intersecting the unit hyperbola, and define $(x,y) = (\cosh a,\sinh a) = (x, \sqrt{x^2-1})$ as the coordinates of the intersection point. Then the area of the hyperbolic sector is the area of the triangle minus the curved region past the vertex at $(1,0)$:
$$\begin{align}
\frac{a}{2} &= \frac{xy}{2} - \int_1^x \sqrt{t^{2}-1} \, dt \\[1ex]
&= \frac{1}{2} \left(x\sqrt{x^2-1}\right) - \frac{1}{2} \left(x\sqrt{x^2-1} - \ln \left(x+\sqrt{x^2-1}\right)\right),
\end{align}$$
which simplifies to the area hyperbolic cosine
$$a=\operatorname{arcosh}x=\ln \left(x+\sqrt{x^2-1}\right).$$
Solving for $x$ yields the exponential form of the hyperbolic cosine:
$$x=\cosh a=\frac{e^a+e^{-a}}{2}.$$
From $x^2-y^2=1$ one gets
$$y=\sinh a=\sqrt{\cosh^2 a - 1}=\frac{e^a-e^{-a}}{2},$$
and its inverse the area hyperbolic sine:
$$a=\operatorname{arsinh}y=\ln \left(y+\sqrt{y^2+1}\right).$$
Other hyperbolic functions are defined according to the hyperbolic cosine and hyperbolic sine, so for example
$$\operatorname{tanh}a=\frac{\sinh a}{\cosh a}=\frac{e^{2a}-1}{e^{2a}+1}.$$

== Properties ==
=== Reflection property ===
Hyperbola: the tangent bisects the lines through the foci

The tangent at a point $P$ bisects the angle between the lines $\overline{PF_1}, \overline{PF_2}.$ This is called the optical property or reflection property of a hyperbola.

Proof

Let $L$ be the point on the line $\overline{PF_2}$ with the distance $2a$ to the focus $F_2$ (see diagram, $a$ is the semi major axis of the hyperbola). Line $w$ is the bisector of the angle between the lines $\overline{PF_1}, \overline{PF_2}$. In order to prove that $w$ is the tangent line at point $P$, one checks that any point $Q$ on line $w$ which is different from $P$ cannot be on the hyperbola. Hence $w$ has only point $P$ in common with the hyperbola and is, therefore, the tangent at point $P$.
From the diagram and the triangle inequality one recognizes that $|QF_2|<|LF_2|+|QL|=2a+|QF_1|$ holds, which means: $|QF_2|-|QF_1|<2a$. But if $Q$ is a point of the hyperbola, the difference should be $2a$.

=== Midpoints of parallel chords ===
Hyperbola: the midpoints of parallel chords lie on a line.

Hyperbola: the midpoint of a chord is the midpoint of the corresponding chord of the asymptotes.

The midpoints of parallel chords of a hyperbola lie on a line through the center (see diagram).

The points of any chord may lie on different branches of the hyperbola.

The proof of the property on midpoints is best done for the hyperbola $y=1/x$. Because any hyperbola is an affine image of the hyperbola $y=1/x$ (see section below) and an affine transformation preserves parallelism and midpoints of line segments, the property is true for all hyperbolas:
For two points $P=\left(x_1,\tfrac {1}{x_1}\right), \ Q=\left(x_2,\tfrac {1}{x_2}\right)$ of the hyperbola $y=1/x$

the midpoint of the chord is $M=\left(\tfrac{x_1+x_2}{2},\cdots\right)=\cdots =\tfrac{x_1+x_2}{2}\; \left(1,\tfrac{1}{x_1x_2}\right) \ ;$

the slope of the chord is $\frac{\tfrac {1}{x_2}-\tfrac {1}{x_1}}{x_2-x_1}=\cdots =-\tfrac{1}{x_1x_2} \ .$

For parallel chords the slope is constant and the midpoints of the parallel chords lie on the line $y=\tfrac{1}{x_1x_2} \; x \ .$

Consequence: for any pair of points $P,Q$ of a chord there exists a skew reflection with an axis (set of fixed points) passing through the center of the hyperbola, which exchanges the points $P,Q$ and leaves the hyperbola (as a whole) fixed. A skew reflection is a generalization of an ordinary reflection across a line $m$, where all point-image pairs are on a line perpendicular to $m$.

Because a skew reflection leaves the hyperbola fixed, the pair of asymptotes is fixed, too. Hence the midpoint $M$ of a chord $P Q$ divides the related line segment $\overline P \, \overline Q$ between the asymptotes into halves, too. This means that $|P\overline P|=|Q\overline Q|$. This property can be used for the construction of further points $Q$ of the hyperbola if a point $P$ and the asymptotes are given.

If the chord degenerates into a tangent, then the touching point divides the line segment between the asymptotes in two halves.

=== Orthogonal tangents – orthoptic ===
Hyperbola with its orthoptic (magenta)

For a hyperbola $\frac{x^2}{a^2}-\frac{y^2}{b^2}=1, \, a>b$ the intersection points of orthogonal tangents lie on the circle $x^2+y^2=a^2-b^2$.
This circle is called the orthoptic of the given hyperbola.

The tangents may belong to points on different branches of the hyperbola.

In case of $a\le b$ there are no pairs of orthogonal tangents.

=== Pole-polar relation for a hyperbola ===
Hyperbola: pole-polar relation

Any hyperbola can be described in a suitable coordinate system by an equation $\tfrac{x^2}{a^2}-\tfrac{y^2}{b^2}= 1$. The equation of the tangent at a point $P_0=(x_0,y_0)$ of the hyperbola is $\tfrac{x_0x}{a^2}-\tfrac{y_0y}{b^2}=1.$ If one allows point $P_0=(x_0,y_0)$ to be an arbitrary point different from the origin, then

point $P_0=(x_0,y_0)\ne(0,0)$ is mapped onto the line $\frac{x_0x}{a^2}-\frac{y_0y}{b^2}=1$, not through the center of the hyperbola.

This relation between points and lines is a bijection.

The inverse function maps

line $y=mx+d,\ d\ne 0$ onto the point $\left(-\frac{ma^2}{d},-\frac{b^2}{d}\right)$ and

line $x=c,\ c\ne 0$ onto the point $\left(\frac{a^2}{c},0\right)\ .$

Such a relation between points and lines generated by a conic is called pole-polar relation or just polarity. The pole is the point, the polar the line. See Pole and polar.

By calculation one checks the following properties of the pole-polar relation of the hyperbola:

- For a point (pole) on the hyperbola the polar is the tangent at this point (see diagram: $P_1,\ p_1$).
- For a pole $P$ outside the hyperbola the intersection points of its polar with the hyperbola are the tangency points of the two tangents passing $P$ (see diagram: $P_2,\ p_2,\ P_3,\ p_3$).
- For a point within the hyperbola the polar has no point with the hyperbola in common. (see diagram: $P_4,\ p_4$).

Remarks:

1. The intersection point of two polars (for example: $p_2,p_3$) is the pole of the line through their poles (here: $P_2,P_3$).
2. The foci $(c,0),$ and $(-c,0)$ respectively and the directrices $x=\tfrac{a^2}{c}$ and $x=-\tfrac{a^2}{c}$ respectively belong to pairs of pole and polar.

Pole-polar relations exist for ellipses and parabolas, too.

=== Other properties ===
- The following are concurrent: (1) a circle passing through the hyperbola's foci and centered at the hyperbola's center; (2) either of the lines that are tangent to the hyperbola at the vertices; and (3) either of the asymptotes of the hyperbola.
- The following are also concurrent: (1) the circle that is centered at the hyperbola's center and that passes through the hyperbola's vertices; (2) either directrix; and (3) either of the asymptotes.
- Since both the transverse axis and the conjugate axis are axes of symmetry, the symmetry group of a hyperbola is the Klein four-group.
- The rectangular hyperbolas xy = constant admit group actions by squeeze mappings which have the hyperbolas as invariant sets.
- The center of a rectangular hyperbola is the Poncelet point of any four points on it that do not form an orthocentric system.

== Arc length ==
The arc length of a hyperbola does not have an elementary expression. The upper half of a hyperbola can be parameterized as

$$y = b\sqrt{\frac{x^{2}}{a^{2}}-1}.$$

Then the integral giving the arc length $s$ from $x_{1}$ to $x_{2}$ can be computed as:

$$s = b\int_{\operatorname{arcosh}\frac{x_{1}}{a}}^{\operatorname{arcosh}\frac{x_{2}}{a}} \sqrt{1+\left(1+\frac{a^{2}}{b^{2}}\right) \sinh ^{2}v} \, \mathrm dv.$$

After using the substitution $z = iv$, this can also be represented using the incomplete elliptic integral of the second kind $E$ with parameter $m = k^2$:

$$s = ib \Biggr[E\left(iv \, \Biggr| \, 1 + \frac{a^2}{b^2}\right)\Biggr]^{\operatorname{arcosh}\frac{x_1}{a}}_{\operatorname{arcosh}\frac{x_2}{a}}.$$

Using only real numbers, this becomes

$$s=b\left[F\left(\operatorname{gd}v\,\Biggr|-\frac{a^2}{b^2}\right) - E\left(\operatorname{gd}v\,\Biggr|-\frac{a^2}{b^2}\right) + \sqrt{1+\frac{a^2}{b^2}\tanh^2 v}\,\sinh v\right]_{\operatorname{arcosh}\tfrac{x_1}{a}}^{\operatorname{arcosh}\tfrac{x_2}{a}}$$

where $F$ is the incomplete elliptic integral of the first kind with parameter $m = k^2$ and $\operatorname{gd}v=\arctan\sinh v$ is the Gudermannian function.

== Derived curves ==
Sinusoidal spirals (r^{n} = −1^{n} cos(nθ), θ = π/2) in polar coordinates and their equivalents in rectangular coordinates: n = −2: Equilateral hyperbola n = −1: Line n = −1/2: Parabola n = 1/2: Cardioid n = 1: Circle n = 2: Lemniscate of Bernoulli

Several other curves can be derived from the hyperbola by inversion, the so-called inverse curves of the hyperbola. If the center of inversion is chosen as the hyperbola's own center, the inverse curve is the lemniscate of Bernoulli; the lemniscate is also the envelope of circles centered on a rectangular hyperbola and passing through the origin. If the center of inversion is chosen at a focus or a vertex of the hyperbola, the resulting inverse curves are a limaçon or a strophoid, respectively.

== Elliptic coordinates ==
A family of confocal hyperbolas is the basis of the system of elliptic coordinates in two dimensions. These hyperbolas are described by the equation

$$\left(\frac x {c \cos\theta}\right)^2 - \left(\frac y {c \sin\theta}\right)^2 = 1$$

where the foci are located at a distance c from the origin on the x-axis, and where θ is the angle of the asymptotes with the x-axis. Every hyperbola in this family is orthogonal to every ellipse that shares the same foci. This orthogonality may be shown by a conformal map of the Cartesian coordinate system w = z + 1/z, where z= x + iy are the original Cartesian coordinates, and w=u + iv are those after the transformation.

Other orthogonal two-dimensional coordinate systems involving hyperbolas may be obtained by other conformal mappings. For example, the mapping w = z^{2} transforms the Cartesian coordinate system into two families of orthogonal hyperbolas.

== Conic section analysis of the hyperbolic appearance of circles ==
Central projection of circles on a sphere: The center O of projection is inside the sphere, the image plane is red. As images of the circles one gets a circle (magenta), ellipses, hyperbolas and lines. The special case of a parabola does not appear in this example. (If center O were on the sphere, all images of the circles would be circles or lines; see stereographic projection).

Besides providing a uniform description of circles, ellipses, parabolas, and hyperbolas, conic sections can also be understood as a natural model of the geometry of perspective in the case where the scene being viewed consists of circles, or more generally an ellipse. The viewer is typically a camera or the human eye and the image of the scene a central projection onto an image plane, that is, all projection rays pass a fixed point O, the center. The lens plane is a plane parallel to the image plane at the lens O.

The image of a circle c is

1. a circle, if circle c is in a special position, for example parallel to the image plane and others (see stereographic projection),
2. an ellipse, if c has no point with the lens plane in common,
3. a parabola, if c has one point with the lens plane in common and
4. a hyperbola, if c has two points with the lens plane in common.

(Special positions where the circle plane contains point O are omitted.)

These results can be understood if one recognizes that the projection process can be seen in two steps: 1) circle c and point O generate a cone which is 2) cut by the image plane, in order to generate the image.

One sees a hyperbola whenever catching sight of a portion of a circle cut by one's lens plane. The inability to see very much of the arms of the visible branch, combined with the complete absence of the second branch, makes it virtually impossible for the human visual system to recognize the connection with hyperbolas.

== Applications ==
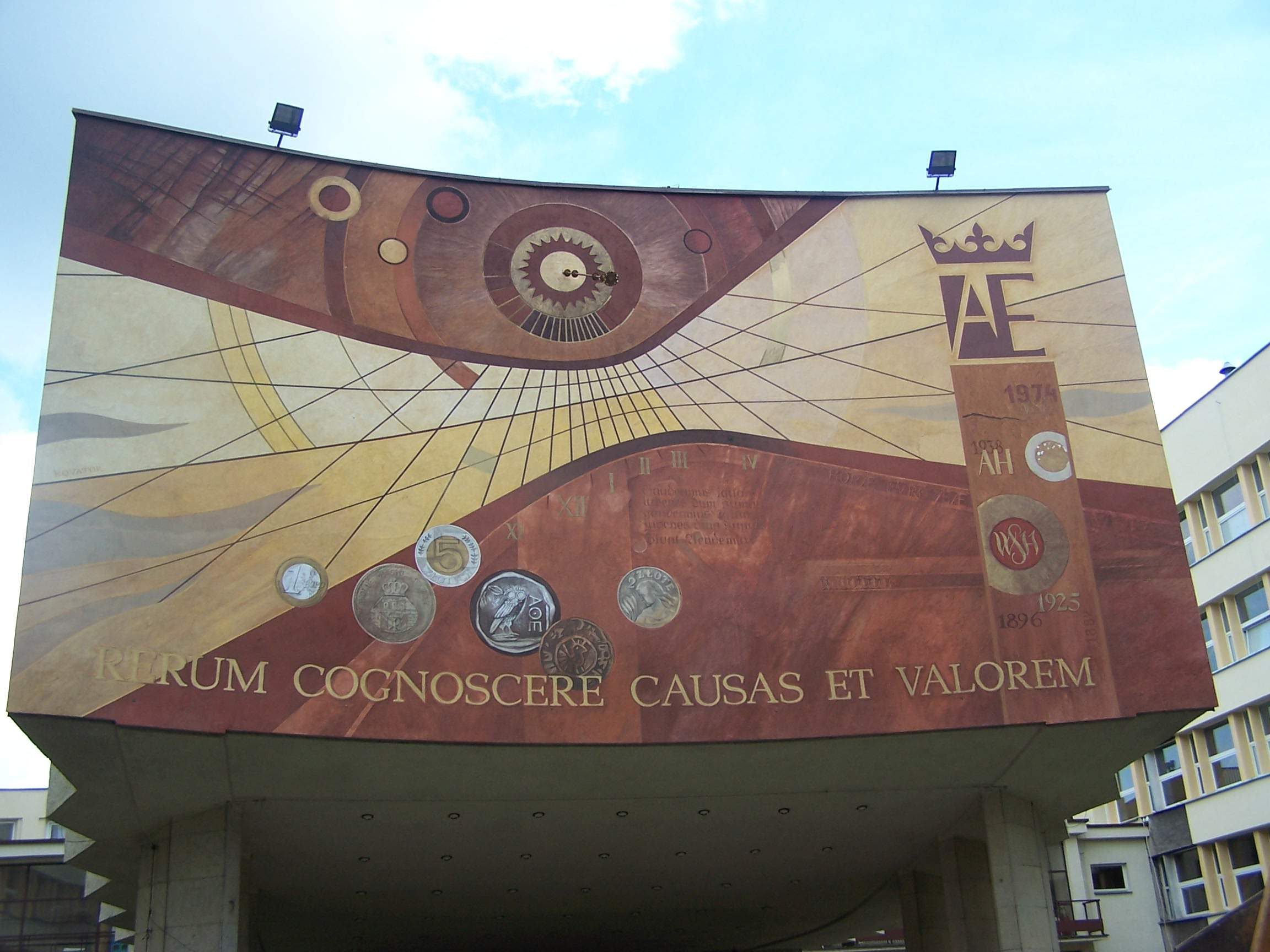
Hyperbolas as declination lines on a sundial

The contact zone of a level supersonic aircraft's shockwave on flat ground (yellow) is a part of a hyperbola as the ground intersects the cone parallel to its axis.

=== Sundials ===
Hyperbolas may be seen in many sundials. On any given day, the sun revolves in a circle on the celestial sphere, and its rays striking the point on a sundial traces out a cone of light. The intersection of this cone with the horizontal plane of the ground forms a conic section. At most populated latitudes and at most times of the year, this conic section is a hyperbola. In practical terms, the shadow of the tip of a pole traces out a hyperbola on the ground over the course of a day (this path is called the declination line). The shape of this hyperbola varies with the geographical latitude and with the time of the year, since those factors affect the cone of the sun's rays relative to the horizon. The collection of such hyperbolas for a whole year at a given location was called a pelekinon by the Greeks, since it resembles a double-bladed axe.

=== Multilateration ===
A hyperbola is the basis for solving multilateration problems, the task of locating a point from the differences in its distances to given points — or, equivalently, the difference in arrival times of synchronized signals between the point and the given points. Such problems are important in navigation, particularly on water; a ship can locate its position from the difference in arrival times of signals from a LORAN or GPS transmitters. Conversely, a homing beacon or any transmitter can be located by comparing the arrival times of its signals at two separate receiving stations; such techniques may be used to track objects and people. In particular, the set of possible positions of a point that has a distance difference of 2a from two given points is a hyperbola of vertex separation 2a whose foci are the two given points.

=== Path followed by a particle ===
The path followed by any particle in the classical Kepler problem is a conic section. In particular, if the total energy E of the particle is greater than zero (that is, if the particle is unbound), the path of such a particle is a hyperbola. This property is useful in studying atomic and sub-atomic forces by scattering high-energy particles; for example, the Rutherford experiment demonstrated the existence of an atomic nucleus by examining the scattering of alpha particles from gold atoms. If the short-range nuclear interactions are ignored, the atomic nucleus and the alpha particle interact only by a repulsive Coulomb force, which satisfies the inverse square law requirement for a Kepler problem.

=== Korteweg–de Vries equation ===
The hyperbolic trig function $\operatorname{sech}\, x$ appears as one solution to the Korteweg–de Vries equation which describes the motion of a soliton wave in a canal.

=== Angle trisection ===
Trisecting an angle (AOB) using a hyperbola of eccentricity 2 (yellow curve)

As shown first by Apollonius of Perga, a hyperbola can be used to trisect any angle, a well studied problem of geometry. Given an angle, first draw a circle centered at its vertex O, which intersects the sides of the angle at points A and B. Next draw the line segment with endpoints A and B and its perpendicular bisector $\ell$. Construct a hyperbola of eccentricity e=2 with $\ell$ as directrix and B as a focus. Let P be the intersection (upper) of the hyperbola with the circle. Angle POB trisects angle AOB.

To prove this, reflect the line segment OP about the line $\ell$ obtaining the point P' as the image of P. Segment AP' has the same length as segment BP due to the reflection, while segment PP' has the same length as segment BP due to the eccentricity of the hyperbola. As OA, OP', OP and OB are all radii of the same circle (and so, have the same length), the triangles OAP', OPP' and OPB are all congruent. Therefore, the angle has been trisected, since 3×POB = AOB.

=== Efficient portfolio frontier ===
In portfolio theory, the locus of mean-variance efficient portfolios (called the efficient frontier) is the upper half of the east-opening branch of a hyperbola drawn with the portfolio return's standard deviation plotted horizontally and its expected value plotted vertically; according to this theory, all rational investors would choose a portfolio characterized by some point on this locus.

=== Biochemistry ===
In biochemistry and pharmacology, the Hill equation and Hill-Langmuir equation respectively describe biological responses and the formation of protein–ligand complexes as functions of ligand concentration. They both can be rectangular hyperbolae in certain special cases.

== Hyperbolas as plane sections of quadrics ==
Hyperbolas appear as plane sections of the following quadrics:

- Elliptic cone
- Hyperbolic cylinder
- Hyperbolic paraboloid
- Hyperboloid of one sheet
- Hyperboloid of two sheets
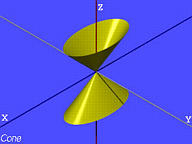
Elliptic cone

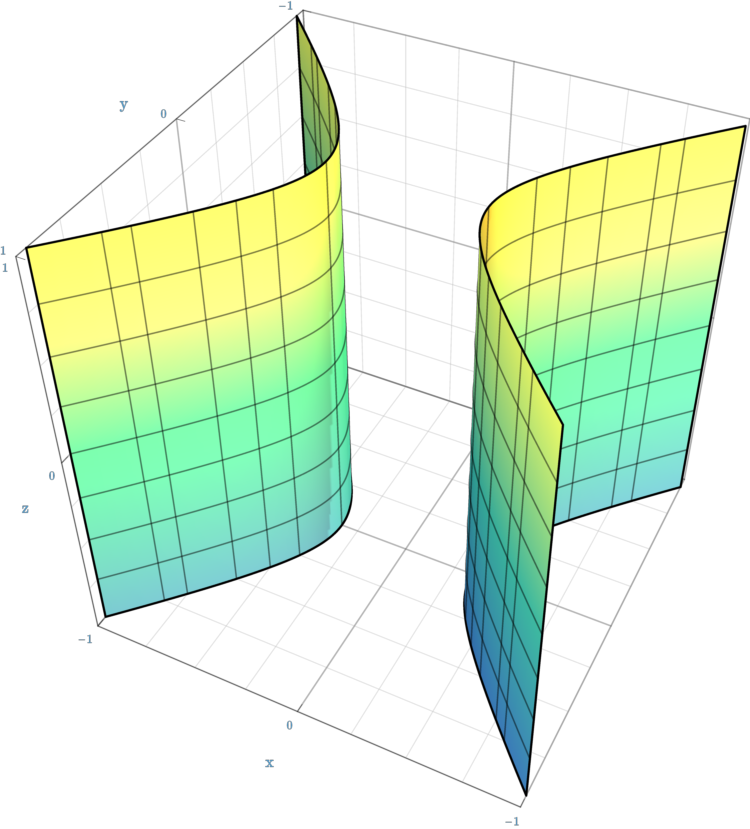
Hyperbolic cylinder

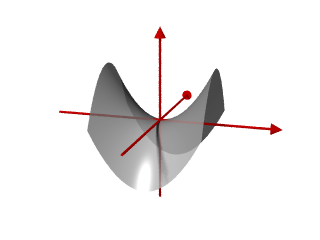
Hyperbolic paraboloid

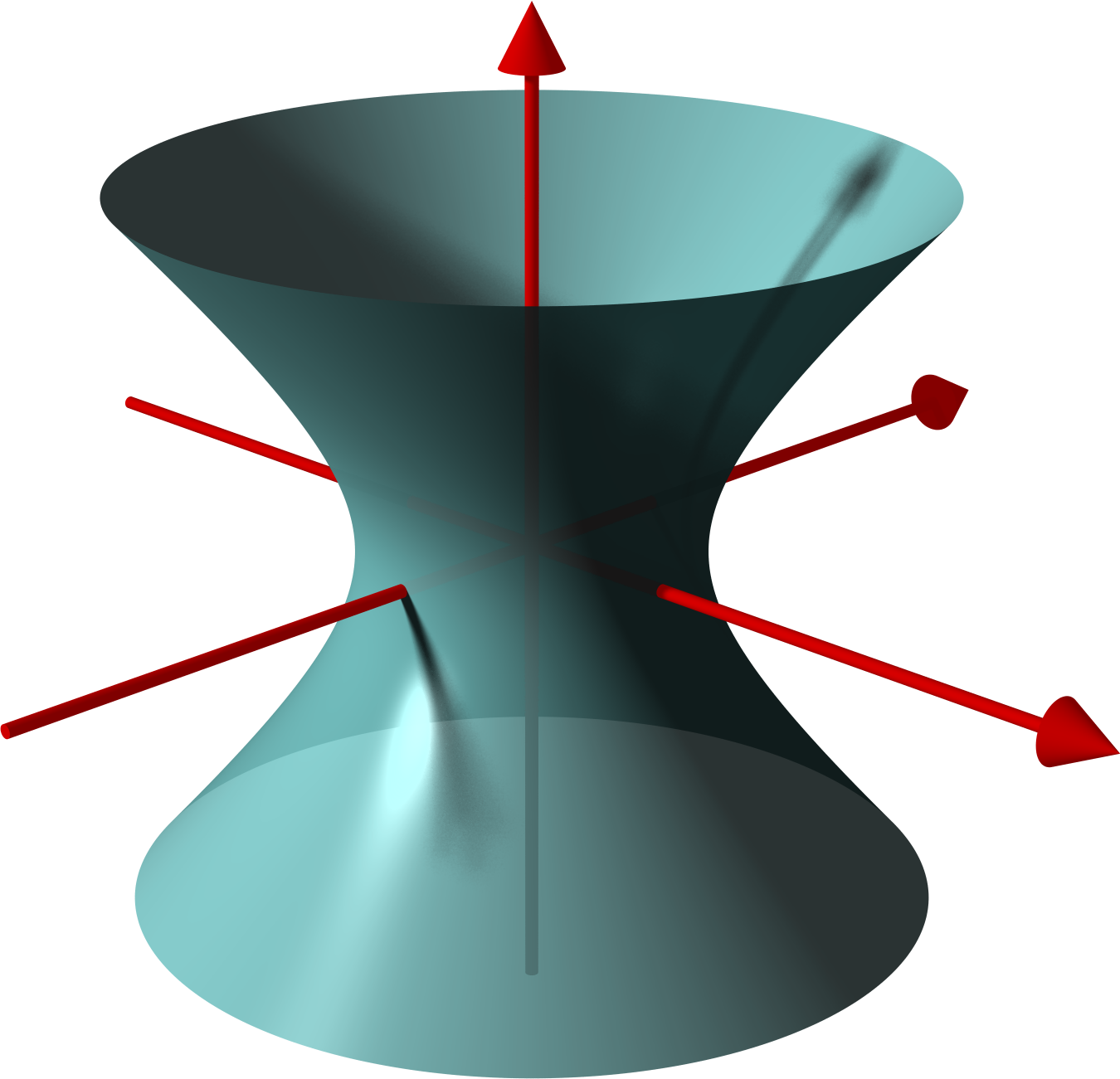
Hyperboloid of one sheet

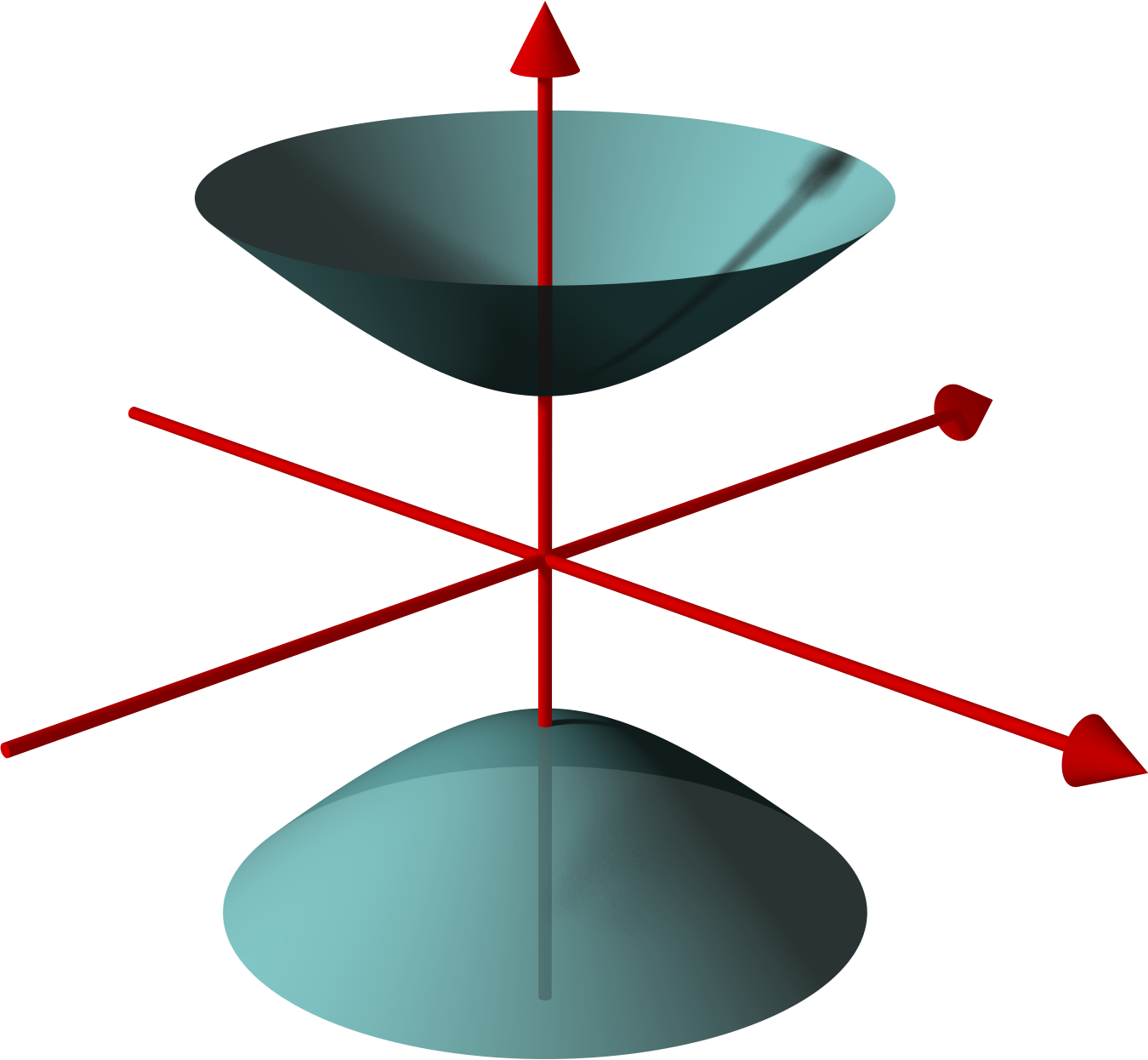
Hyperboloid of two sheets

== See also ==
=== Other conic sections ===
- Circle
- Ellipse
- Parabola
- Degenerate conic

=== Other related topics ===
- Elliptic coordinates, an orthogonal coordinate system based on families of ellipses and hyperbolas.
- Hyperbolic growth
- Hyperbolic partial differential equation
- Hyperbolic sector
- Hyperboloid structure
- Hyperbolic trajectory
- Hyperboloid
- Multilateration
- Rotation of axes
- Translation of axes
- Unit hyperbola
