= Index of logarithm articles =

This is a list of logarithm topics, by Wikipedia page. See also the list of exponential topics.

- Acoustic power
- Amoeba (mathematics)
- Antilogarithm
- Apparent magnitude
- Baker's theorem
- Bel
- Benford's law
- Binary logarithm
- Bode plot
- Henry Briggs
- Bygrave slide rule
- Cologarithm
- Common logarithm
- Complex logarithm
- Discrete logarithm
  - Discrete logarithm records
- e
  - Representations of e
- El Gamal discrete log cryptosystem
- Harmonic series
- History of logarithms
- Hyperbolic sector
- Iterated logarithm
- Otis King
- Law of the iterated logarithm
- Linear form in logarithms
- Linearithmic
- List of integrals of logarithmic functions
- Log canonical singularity
- Log-likelihood ratio
- Log-log graph
- Log-normal distribution
- Log-periodic antenna
- Log semiring
- Log structure
- Log-Weibull distribution
- Logarithmic algorithm
- Logarithmic convolution
- Logarithmic decrement
- Logarithmic derivative
- Logarithmic differential
- Logarithmic differentiation
- Logarithmic distribution
- Logarithmic form
- Logarithmic graph paper
- Logarithmic growth
- Logarithmic identities
- Logarithmic mean
- Logarithmic number system
- Logarithmic scale
- Logarithmic spiral
- Logit
- LogSumExp
- Mantissa is a disambiguation page; see common logarithm for the traditional concept of mantissa; see significand for the modern concept used in computing.
- Matrix logarithm
- Mel scale
- Mercator projection
- Mercator series
- Moment magnitude scale
- John Napier
- Napierian logarithm
- Natural logarithm
  - Natural logarithm of 2
- Neper
- Offset logarithmic integral
- pH
- Plethystic logarithm
- Pollard's kangaroo algorithm
- Pollard's rho algorithm for logarithms
- Polylogarithm
- Polylogarithmic function
- Prime number theorem
- Richter magnitude scale
- Grégoire de Saint-Vincent
- Alphonse Antonio de Sarasa
- Schnorr signature
- Semi-log graph
- Significand
- Slide rule
- Smearing retransformation
- Sound intensity level
- Stochastic logarithm
- Super-logarithm
- Table of logarithms
- Weber-Fechner law
