= Francis Xavier Aynscom =

Flemish Jesuit of English extraction

Francis Xavier Aynscom (1624–1660) was a Flemish Jesuit of English extraction. He was born in Antwerp in 1624 and entered the Society of Jesus there, becoming a teacher of literature and mathematics in the order. In 1656 he published a book defending Grégoire de Saint-Vincent's work on squaring the circle. He died in Antwerp at the age of thirty-six.
