= Quadrature (mathematics) =

Mathematical term for squaring a plane figure

In mathematics, quadrature is a historic term for the computation of areas and is thus used for computation of integrals.

The word is derived from the Latin quadratus meaning "square". The reason is that, for Ancient Greek mathematicians, the computation of an area consisted of constructing a square of the same area. In this sense, the modern term is squaring. For example, the quadrature of the circle, (or squaring the circle) is a famous old problem that has been shown, in the 19th century, to be impossible with the methods available to the Ancient Greeks.

Integral calculus, introduced in the 17th century, is a general method for computation of areas. Quadrature came to refer to the computation of any integral; such a computation is presently called more often "integral" or "integration". However, the computation of solutions of differential equations and differential systems is also called integration, and quadrature remains useful for distinguishing integrals from solutions of differential equations, in contexts where both problems are considered. This is the case in numerical analysis; see numerical quadrature. Also, reduction to quadratures and solving by quadratures means expressing solutions of differential equations in terms of integrals.

The remainder of this article is devoted to the original meaning of quadrature, namely, computation of areas.

== History ==
=== Antiquity ===
The lune of Hippocrates was the first curved figure to have its exact area calculated mathematically.

Greek mathematicians understood the determination of an area of a figure as the process of geometrically constructing a square having the same area (squaring), thus the name quadrature for this process. The Greek geometers were not always successful (see squaring the circle), but they did carry out quadratures of some figures whose sides were not simply line segments, such as the lune of Hippocrates and the parabola. By a certain Greek tradition, these constructions had to be performed using only a compass and straightedge, though not all Greek mathematicians adhered to this dictum.

Antique method to find the geometric mean

For a quadrature of a rectangle with the sides a and b it is necessary to construct a square with the side $x =\sqrt {ab}$ (the geometric mean of a and b). For this purpose it is possible to use the following: if one draws the circle with diameter made from joining line segments of lengths a and b, then the height (BH in the diagram) of the line segment drawn perpendicular to the diameter, from the point of their connection to the point where it crosses the circle, equals the geometric mean of a and b. A similar geometrical construction solves the problems of quadrature of a parallelogram and of a triangle.

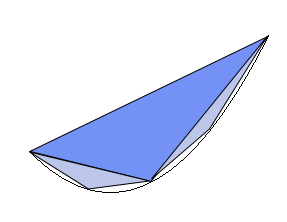
Archimedes proved that the area of a parabolic segment is 4/3 the area of an inscribed triangle.

Problems of quadrature for curvilinear figures are much more difficult. The quadrature of the circle with compass and straightedge was proved in the 19th century to be impossible. Nevertheless, for some figures a quadrature can be performed. The quadratures of the surface of a sphere and a parabola segment discovered by Archimedes became the highest achievement of analysis in antiquity.

- The area of the surface of a sphere is equal to four times the area of the circle formed by a great circle of this sphere.
- The area of a segment of a parabola determined by a straight line cutting it is 4/3 the area of a triangle inscribed in this segment (specifically, of a triangle whose vertices are the parabola's two intersection points with the secant line and its intersection with a tangent line of the same slope).

For the proofs of these results, Archimedes used the method of exhaustion attributed to Eudoxus.

=== Medieval mathematics ===
In medieval Europe, quadrature meant the calculation of area by any method. Most often the method of indivisibles was used; it was less rigorous than the geometric constructions of the Greeks, but it was simpler and more powerful. With its help, Galileo Galilei and Gilles de Roberval found the area of a cycloid arch, Grégoire de Saint-Vincent investigated the area under a hyperbola (Opus Geometricum, 1647), and Alphonse Antonio de Sarasa, de Saint-Vincent's pupil and commentator, noted the relation of this area to logarithms.

=== Integral calculus ===
John Wallis algebrised this method; he wrote in his Arithmetica Infinitorum (1656) some series which are equivalent to what is now called the definite integral, and he calculated their values. Isaac Barrow and James Gregory made further progress: quadratures for some algebraic curves and spirals. Christiaan Huygens successfully performed a quadrature of the surface area of some solids of revolution.

The quadrature of the hyperbola by Gregoire de Saint-Vincent and A. A. de Sarasa provided a new function, the natural logarithm, of critical importance. With the invention of integral calculus came a universal method for area calculation. In response, the term quadrature has become traditional, and instead the modern phrase finding the area is more commonly used for what is technically the computation of a univariate definite integral.

== See also ==
- Gaussian quadrature
- Hyperbolic angle
- Numerical integration
- Quadratrix
- Tanh–sinh quadrature
