= Squaring =

Squaring may refer to:

- Square (algebra), the result of multiplying something by itself
- Quadrature (mathematics), the process of determining the area of a plane figure
