= Convolution (disambiguation) =

In mathematics, convolution is a binary operation on functions.

== Kinds ==
- Circular convolution
- Convolution theorem
  - Titchmarsh convolution theorem
- Dirichlet convolution
- Infimal convolution
- Logarithmic convolution
- Vandermonde convolution

== Applications ==
- Convolution, in digital image processing, with a Kernel (image processing)
- Convolutional code, in telecommunication
- Convolution of probability distributions
- Convolution reverb, a process used for digitally simulating the reverberation of a physical or virtual space
- Convolution random number generator, a pseudo-random number sampling method that can be used to generate random variates from certain classes of probability distribution

== See also ==
- Convolute (disambiguation)
