= Convolute =

Convolute may refer to:

- Convolute (botany)
- Convolute (manuscript), a volume containing several manuscripts
- Convolute (segment), along with gores, material segments used in pressure suit joints to allow for increased mobility
- Convolute laminations in geology
  - Distal convoluted tubule

== See also ==
- Convolution (disambiguation)
