= Smearing retransformation =

The Smearing retransformation is used in regression analysis, after estimating the logarithm of a variable. Estimating the logarithm of a variable instead of the variable itself is a common technique to more closely approximate normality. In order to retransform the variable back to level from log, the Smearing retransformation is used.

If the log-transformed variable y is normally distributed with mean

$f(X)$ and variance $\sigma^2$

then, the expected value of y is given by:

$y = \exp(f(X))\exp(\frac{1}{2}\sigma^2).$
