= Natural logarithm =

Logarithm to the base of the mathematical constant e

- Graph of part of the natural logarithm function. The function slowly grows to positive infinity as x increases, and slowly goes to negative infinity as x approaches 0 ("slowly" as compared to any power law of x).

General information
- General definition
- Motivation of invention: hyperbola quadrature
- Fields of application: Pure and applied mathematics

Domain, codomain and image
- Domain: $\mathbb{R}_{> 0}$
- Codomain: $\mathbb{R}$
- Image: $\mathbb{R}$

Specific values
- Value at +∞: +∞
- Value at e: 1
- Value at 1: 0
- Value at 0: −∞

Specific features
- Asymptote: $x = 0$
- Root: 1
- Inverse: $\exp x$
- Derivative: $\dfrac{d}{dx}\ln x = \dfrac{1}{x} , x > 0$
- Antiderivative: $\int \ln x\,dx = x \left( \ln x - 1 \right) + C$

The natural logarithm of a number is its logarithm to the base of the mathematical constant e, which is an irrational and transcendental number approximately equal to 2.718. The natural logarithm of x is generally written as ln x, log_{e} x, or sometimes, if the base e is implicit, simply log x. Parentheses are sometimes added for clarity, giving ln(x), log_{e}(x), or log(x). This is done particularly when the argument to the logarithm is not a single symbol, so as to prevent ambiguity.

The natural logarithm of x is the power to which e would have to be raised to equal x. For example, ln 7.5 is 2.0149..., because e^{2.0149...} = 7.5. The natural logarithm of e itself, ln e, is 1, because e^{1} = e, while the natural logarithm of 1 is 0, since e^{0} = 1.

The natural logarithm can be defined for any positive real number a as the area under the curve y = 1/x from 1 to a (with the area being negative when 0 < a < 1). The simplicity of this definition, which is matched in many other formulas involving the natural logarithm, leads to the term "natural". The definition of the natural logarithm can then be extended to give logarithm values for negative numbers and for all non-zero complex numbers, although this leads to a multi-valued function: see complex logarithm for more.

The natural logarithm function, if considered as a real-valued function of a positive real variable, is the inverse function of the exponential function, leading to the identities:
$$\begin{align}
e^{\ln x} &= x \qquad \text{ if } x \in \R_{+}\\
\ln e^x   &= x \qquad \text{ if } x \in \R
\end{align}$$

Like all logarithms, the natural logarithm maps multiplication of positive numbers into addition:
$$\ln( x \cdot y ) = \ln x + \ln y~.$$

Logarithms can be defined for any positive base b other than 1, not only e. However, logarithms in other bases differ only by a constant multiplier from the natural logarithm, and can be defined in terms of the latter, $\log_b x = \ln x / \ln b$.

Logarithms are useful for solving equations in which the unknown appears as the exponent of some other quantity. For example, logarithms are used to solve for the half-life, decay constant, or unknown time in exponential decay problems. They are important in many branches of mathematics and scientific disciplines, and are used to solve problems involving compound interest.

== History ==
The concept of the natural logarithm was worked out by Gregoire de Saint-Vincent and Alphonse Antonio de Sarasa before 1649. Their work involved quadrature of the hyperbola with equation xy = 1, by determination of the area of hyperbolic sectors. Their solution generated the requisite "hyperbolic logarithm" function, which had the properties now associated with the natural logarithm.

An early mention of the natural logarithm was by Nicholas Mercator in his work Logarithmotechnia, published in 1668, although the mathematics teacher John Speidell had already compiled a table of what in fact were effectively natural logarithms in 1619. It has been said that Speidell's logarithms were to the base e, but this is not entirely true due to complications with the values being expressed as integers.

== Definition and properties ==
The natural logarithm can be defined more generally as the inverse function of the exponential function $e^x$, so that $e^{\ln(x)} = x$ or $\ln(e^x) = x$. Because the exponential function $e^x$ is positive and invertible for any real input $x$, this definition of $\ln(x)$ is well defined for any positive $x$. That is, the domain of a natural logarithm is $x \in (0, \infty)$.

The natural logarithm ln a is the area of the shaded region under the curve f(x) = 1/x from 1 to a. If a is less than 1, the area is taken to be negative.

The natural logarithm can be defined as the area under the graph of a rectangular hyperbola with equation $y = 1/x$ between $x = 1$ and $x = a$. That is,
$$\ln a = \int_1^a \frac{1}{x}\,dx.$$
If a is in $(0,1)$, then the region has negative area, and the logarithm is negative.

The natural logarithm obeys the following mathematical properties, which can be used to simplify formulae that combine them with multiplication or exponentiation:
$$\begin{align}
\ln 1 &= 0, \\
\ln e &= 1, \\
\ln(xy) &= \ln x + \ln y \quad \text{for }\; x > 0\;\text{and }\; y > 0, \\
\ln(x/y) &= \ln x - \ln y \quad \text{for }\; x > 0\;\text{and }\; y > 0, \\
\ln(x^y) &= y \ln x \quad \text{for }\; x > 0, \\
\ln(\sqrt[y]{x}) &= (\ln x) / y \quad \text{for }\; x > 0\;\text{and }\; y \ne 0, \\
\ln x &< \ln y \quad\text{for }\; 0 < x < y.
\end{align}$$

As $x$ approaches $0$ from the right, the natural logarithm approaches negative infinity, $-\infty$. As $x$ approaches $\infty$, the natural logarithm approaches $\infty$. By the concept of limit, these are:
$$\lim_{x\to 0^{+}} \ln x = -\infty , \quad \lim_{x\to\infty} \ln x = \infty$$

== Notation ==
The mathematical notation for the natural logarithm of x, or the logarithm to the base e of a number x, can be written as ln x, as log_{e} x, or, when the base e is implicitly known, as log x. The log_{e} x form is a specific instance of the general notation for the logarithm to base b of a number x, which is shown as log_{b} x. (For example, the base-2 logarithm of 8 can be written as log_{2} 8 = 3.) Some authors use log x without an explicit base to refer to the natural logarithm. An example can be commonly found in prime number theorem. In addition to mathematics, this usage is commonplace in some programming languages. However, in some other contexts such as chemistry, log x can be used to denote the common (base 10) logarithm. It may also refer to the binary (base 2) logarithm in the context of computer science, particularly in the context of time complexity.

== In calculus ==
=== Several identities ===
- $\lim_{x \to 0} \frac{\ln(1+x)}{x} = 1$
- $\lim_{\alpha \to 0} \frac{x^\alpha-1}{\alpha} = \ln x\quad \text{for }\; x > 0$
- $\frac{x-1}{x} \leq \ln x \leq x-1 \quad\text{for}\quad x > 0$
- $\ln{( 1+x^\alpha )} \leq \alpha x \quad\text{for}\quad x \ge 0\;\text{and }\; \alpha \ge 1$

=== Series ===
The Taylor polynomials for ln(1 + x) only provide accurate approximations in the range −1 < x ≤ 1. Beyond some x > 1, the Taylor polynomials of higher degree are increasingly worse approximations.

Since the natural logarithm $\ln(x)$ is undefined at 0, the function itself does not have a Maclaurin series, unlike many other elementary functions. Instead, one looks for Taylor expansions around other points. For example, if $\vert x - 1 \vert \leq 1$ and $x \neq 0,$ then
$$\begin{align}
\ln x &= \int_1^x \frac{1}{t} \, dt = \int_0^{x - 1} \frac{1}{1 + u} \, du \\
&= \int_0^{x - 1} (1 - u + u^2 - u^3 + \cdots) \, du \\
&= (x - 1) - \frac{(x - 1)^2}{2} + \frac{(x - 1)^3}{3} - \frac{(x - 1)^4}{4} + \cdots \\
&= \sum_{k=1}^\infty \frac{(-1)^{k-1} (x-1)^k}{k}.
\end{align}$$

This is the Taylor series for $\ln x$ around 1. A change of variables yields the Mercator series:
$$\ln(1+x)=\sum_{k=1}^\infty \frac{(-1)^{k-1}}{k} x^k = x - \frac{x^2}{2} + \frac{x^3}{3} - \cdots,$$
valid for $|x| \leq 1$ and $x\ne -1.$

Leonhard Euler, disregarding $x\ne -1$, nevertheless applied this series to $x=-1$ to show that the harmonic series equals the natural logarithm of $\frac{1}{1-1}$; that is, the logarithm of infinity. Nowadays, more formally, one can prove that the harmonic series truncated at N is close to the logarithm of N, when N is large, with the difference converging to the Euler–Mascheroni constant.

The figure is a graph of ln(1 + x) and some of its Taylor polynomials around 0. These approximations converge to the function only in the region −1 < x ≤ 1; outside this region, the higher-degree Taylor polynomials devolve to worse approximations for the function.

A useful special case for positive integers n, taking $x = \tfrac{1}{n}$, is:
$$\ln \left(\frac{n + 1}{n}\right) = \sum_{k=1}^\infty \frac{(-1)^{k-1}}{k n^k}  = \frac{1}{n} - \frac{1}{2 n^2} + \frac{1}{3 n^3} - \frac{1}{4 n^4} + \cdots$$

If $\operatorname{Re}(x) \ge 1/2,$ then
$$\begin{align}
\ln (x) &= - \ln \left(\frac{1}{x}\right) = - \sum_{k=1}^\infty \frac{(-1)^{k-1} (\frac{1}{x} - 1)^k}{k} = \sum_{k=1}^\infty \frac{(x - 1)^k}{k x^k} \\
&= \frac{x - 1}{x} + \frac{(x - 1)^2}{2 x^2} +  \frac{(x - 1)^3}{3 x^3} + \frac{(x - 1)^4}{4 x^4} + \cdots
\end{align}$$

Now, taking $x=\tfrac{n+1}{n}$ for positive integers n, we get:
$$\ln \left(\frac{n + 1}{n}\right) = \sum_{k=1}^\infty \frac{1}{k (n + 1)^k} = \frac{1}{n + 1} + \frac{1}{2 (n + 1)^2} + \frac{1}{3 (n + 1)^3} + \frac{1}{4 (n + 1)^4} + \cdots$$

If $\operatorname{Re}(x) \ge 0$ and $x \neq 0,$ then
$$\ln (x) = \ln \left(\frac{2x}{2}\right) = \ln\left(\frac{1 + \frac{x - 1}{x + 1}}{1 - \frac{x - 1}{x + 1}}\right) = \ln \left(1 + \frac{x - 1}{x + 1}\right) - \ln \left(1 - \frac{x - 1}{x + 1}\right).$$
Since
$$\begin{align}
\ln(1+y) - \ln(1-y)&= \sum^\infty_{i=1}\frac{1}{i}\left((-1)^{i-1}y^i - (-1)^{i-1}(-y)^i\right) = \sum^\infty_{i=1}\frac{y^i}{i}\left((-1)^{i-1} +1\right)  \\
&= y\sum^\infty_{i=1}\frac{y^{i-1}}{i}\left((-1)^{i-1} +1\right)\overset{i-1\to 2k}{=}\; 2y\sum^\infty_{k=0}\frac{y^{2k}}{2k+1},
\end{align}$$
we arrive at
$$\begin{align}
\ln (x) &= \frac{2(x - 1)}{x + 1} \sum_{k = 0}^\infty \frac{1}{2k + 1} {\left(\frac{(x - 1)^2}{(x + 1)^2}\right)}^k \\
&= \frac{2(x - 1)}{x + 1} \left( \frac{1}{1} + \frac{1}{3} \frac{(x - 1)^2}{(x + 1)^2} + \frac{1}{5} {\left(\frac{(x - 1)^2}{(x + 1)^2}\right)}^2 + \cdots \right) .
\end{align}$$
Using the substitution $x=\tfrac{n+1}{n}$ again for positive integers n, we get:
$$\begin{align}
\ln \left(\frac{n + 1}{n}\right) &= \frac{2}{2n + 1} \sum_{k=0}^\infty \frac{1}{(2k + 1) ((2n + 1)^2)^k}\\
&= 2 \left(\frac{1}{2n + 1} + \frac{1}{3 (2n + 1)^3} + \frac{1}{5 (2n + 1)^5} + \cdots \right).
\end{align}$$

This is by far the fastest-converging series described here.

The natural logarithm can also be expressed as an infinite product:
$$\ln(x)=(x-1) \prod_{k=1}^\infty \left ( \frac{2}{1+\sqrt[2^k]{x}} \right )$$

Two examples might be:
$$\ln(2)=\left ( \frac{2}{1+\sqrt{2}} \right )\left ( \frac{2}{1+\sqrt[4]{2}} \right )\left ( \frac{2}{1+\sqrt[8]{2}} \right )\left ( \frac{2}{1+\sqrt[16]{2}} \right )...$$
$$\pi=(2i+2)\left ( \frac{2}{1+\sqrt{i}} \right )\left ( \frac{2}{1+\sqrt[4]{i}} \right )\left ( \frac{2}{1+\sqrt[8]{i}} \right )\left ( \frac{2}{1+\sqrt[16]{i}} \right )...$$

From this identity, by taking the natural logarithm then differentiating, we get:
$$\frac{1}{\ln(x)}=\frac{x}{x-1}-\sum_{k=1}^\infty\frac{2^{-k}x^{2^{-k}}}{1+x^{2^{-k}}}$$

For example:
$$\frac{1}{\ln(2)} = 2-\frac{\sqrt{2}}{2+2\sqrt{2}}-\frac{\sqrt[4]{2}}{4+4\sqrt[4]{2}}-\frac{\sqrt[8]{2}}{8+8\sqrt[8]{2}}  \cdots$$

=== Integration ===
The natural logarithm allows simple integration of functions of the form $g(x) = \frac{f'(x)}{f(x)}$: an antiderivative of g(x) is given by $\ln (|f(x)|)$. This is the case because of the chain rule and the following fact:
$$\frac{d}{dx}\ln \left| x \right| = \frac{1}{x}, \ \  x \ne 0$$

In other words, when integrating over an interval of the real line that does not include $x=0$, then
$$\int \frac{1}{x} \,dx = \ln|x| + C$$
where C is an arbitrary constant of integration.

Likewise, when the integral is over an interval where $f(x) \ne 0$,
$$\int { \frac{f'(x)}{f(x)}\,dx} = \ln|f(x)| + C.$$
For example, consider the integral of $\tan (x)$ over an interval that does not include points where $\tan (x)$ is infinite:
$$\int \tan x \,dx = \int \frac{\sin x}{\cos x} \,dx = -\int \frac{\frac{d}{dx} \cos x}{\cos x} \,dx = -\ln \left| \cos x \right| + C = \ln \left| \sec x \right| + C.$$

The natural logarithm can be integrated using integration by parts. Let:
$$u = \ln x \Rightarrow du = \frac{dx}{x}$$
$$dv = dx  \Rightarrow v = x$$
then:
$$\begin{align}
\int \ln x \,dx & = x \ln x - \int \frac{x}{x} \,dx \\
& = x \ln x - x + C
\end{align}$$

== Efficient computation ==
For $\ln (x)$ where x > 1, the closer the value of x is to 1, the faster the rate of convergence of its Taylor series centered at 1.

=== Natural logarithm of 10 ===
The natural logarithm of 10, a transcendental number approximately equal to 2.30258509, plays a role for example in the computation of natural logarithms of numbers represented in scientific notation, as a mantissa multiplied by a power of 10:
$$\ln(a\cdot 10^n) = \ln a + n \ln 10.$$

This means that one can effectively calculate the logarithms of numbers with very large or very small magnitude using the logarithms of a relatively small set of decimals in the range [1, 10).

=== High precision ===
To compute the natural logarithm with many digits of precision, the Taylor series approach is not efficient since the convergence is slow. Especially if x is near 1, a good alternative is to use Halley's method or Newton's method to invert the exponential function, because the series of the exponential function converges more quickly. For finding the value of y to give $\exp(y)-x=0$ using Halley's method, or equivalently to give $\exp(y/2) -x \exp(-y/2)=0$ using Newton's method, the iteration simplifies to
$$y_{n+1} = y_n + 2 \cdot \frac{ x - \exp ( y_n ) }{ x + \exp ( y_n ) }$$
which has cubic convergence to $\ln (x)$.

Another alternative for extremely high precision calculation is the formula
$$\ln x \approx \frac{\pi}{2 M(1,4/s)} - m \ln 2,$$
where M denotes the arithmetic-geometric mean of 1 and 4/s, and
$$s = x 2^m > 2^{p/2},$$
with m chosen so that p bits of precision is attained. (For most purposes, the value of 8 for m is sufficient.) In fact, if this method is used, Newton inversion of the natural logarithm may conversely be used to calculate the exponential function efficiently. (The constants $\ln 2$ and π can be pre-computed to the desired precision using any of several known quickly converging series.) Or, the following formula can be used:
$$\ln x = \frac{\pi}{M\left(\theta_2^2(1/x),\theta_3^2(1/x)\right)},\quad x\in (1,\infty)$$
where
$$\theta_2(x) = \sum_{n\in\Z} x^{(n+1/2)^2},
\quad
\theta_3(x) = \sum_{n\in\Z} x^{n^2}$$
are the Jacobi theta functions.

Based on a proposal by William Kahan and first implemented in the Hewlett-Packard HP-41C calculator in 1979 (referred to under "LN1" in the display, only), some calculators, operating systems (for example Berkeley UNIX 4.3BSD), computer algebra systems and programming languages (for example C99) provide a special natural logarithm plus 1 function, alternatively named LNP1, or log1p to give more accurate results for logarithms close to zero by passing arguments x, also close to zero, to a function log1p(x), which returns the value ln(1+x), instead of passing a value y close to 1 to a function returning ln(y). The function log1p avoids in the floating point arithmetic a near cancelling of the absolute term 1 with the second term from the Taylor expansion of the natural logarithm. This keeps the argument, the result, and intermediate steps all close to zero where they can be most accurately represented as floating-point numbers.

In addition to base e, the IEEE 754-2008 standard defines similar logarithmic functions near 1 for binary and decimal logarithms: log_{2}(1 + x) and log_{10}(1 + x).

Similar inverse functions named "expm1", "expm" or "exp1m" exist as well, all with the meaning of expm1(x) = exp(x) − 1. (Note: For a similar approach to reduce round-off errors of calculations for certain input values see trigonometric functions like versine and exsecant.)

An identity in terms of the inverse hyperbolic tangent,
$$\mathrm{log1p}(x) = \log(1+x) = 2 ~ \mathrm{artanh}\left(\frac{x}{2+x}\right)\,,$$
gives a high precision value for small values of x on systems that do not implement log1p(x).

=== Computational complexity ===
The computational complexity of computing the natural logarithm using the arithmetic-geometric mean (for both of the above methods) is $\text{O}\bigl(M(n) \ln n \bigr)$. Here, n is the number of digits of precision at which the natural logarithm is to be evaluated, and M(n) is the computational complexity of multiplying two n-digit numbers.

== Continued fractions ==
While no simple continued fractions are available, several generalized continued fractions exist, including:
$$\begin{align}
\ln(1+x) & =\frac{x^1}{1}-\frac{x^2}{2}+\frac{x^3}{3}-\frac{x^4}{4}+\frac{x^5}{5}-\cdots \\[5pt]
& = \cfrac{x}{1-0x+\cfrac{1^2x}{2-1x+\cfrac{2^2x}{3-2x+\cfrac{3^2x}{4-3x+\cfrac{4^2x}{5-4x+\ddots}}}}}
\end{align}$$
$$\begin{align}
\ln\left(1+\frac{x}{y}\right) & = \cfrac{x} {y+\cfrac{1x} {2+\cfrac{1x} {3y+\cfrac{2x} {2+\cfrac{2x} {5y+\cfrac{3x} {2+\ddots}}}}}} \\[5pt]
& = \cfrac{2x} {2y+x-\cfrac{(1x)^2} {3(2y+x)-\cfrac{(2x)^2} {5(2y+x)-\cfrac{(3x)^2} {7(2y+x)-\ddots}}}}
\end{align}$$

These continued fractions—particularly the last—converge rapidly for values close to 1. However, the natural logarithms of much larger numbers can easily be computed, by repeatedly adding those of smaller numbers, with similarly rapid convergence.

For example, since 2 = 1.25^{3} × 1.024, the natural logarithm of 2 can be computed as:
$$\begin{align}
\ln 2 & = 3 \ln\left(1+\frac{1}{4}\right) + \ln\left(1+\frac{3}{125}\right) \\[8pt]
& = \cfrac{6} {9-\cfrac{1^2} {27-\cfrac{2^2} {45-\cfrac{3^2} {63-\ddots}}}}
+ \cfrac{6} {253-\cfrac{3^2} {759-\cfrac{6^2} {1265-\cfrac{9^2} {1771-\ddots}}}}.
\end{align}$$

Furthermore, since 10 = 1.25^{10} × 1.024^{3}, even the natural logarithm of 10 can be computed similarly as:
$$\begin{align}
\ln 10 & = 10 \ln\left(1+\frac{1}{4}\right) + 3\ln\left(1+\frac{3}{125}\right) \\[10pt]
& = \cfrac{20} {9-\cfrac{1^2} {27-\cfrac{2^2} {45-\cfrac{3^2} {63-\ddots}}}}
+ \cfrac{18} {253-\cfrac{3^2} {759-\cfrac{6^2} {1265-\cfrac{9^2} {1771-\ddots}}}}.
\end{align}$$
The reciprocal of the natural logarithm can be also written in this way:
$$\frac {1}{\ln(x)} = \frac {2x}{x^2-1}\sqrt{\frac {1}{2}+\frac {x^2+1}{4x}}\sqrt{\frac {1}{2}+\frac {1}{2}\sqrt{\frac {1}{2}+\frac {x^2+1}{4x}}}\ldots$$

For example:
$$\frac {1}{\ln(2)} = \frac {4}{3}\sqrt{\frac {1}{2} + \frac {5}{8}} \sqrt{\frac {1}{2} + \frac {1}{2} \sqrt{\frac {1}{2} +\frac {5}{8}}} \ldots$$

== Complex logarithms ==
The exponential function can be extended to a function which gives a complex number as e^{z} for any arbitrary complex number z; simply use the infinite series with x = z complex. This exponential function can be inverted to form a complex logarithm that exhibits most of the properties of the ordinary logarithm. There are two difficulties involved: no x has e^{x} = 0; and it turns out that e^{2iπ} = 1 = e^{0}. Since the multiplicative property still works for the complex exponential function, e^{z} = e^{z+2kiπ}, for all complex z and integers k.

So the logarithm cannot be defined for the whole complex plane, and even then it is multi-valued—any complex logarithm can be changed into an "equivalent" logarithm by adding any integer multiple of 2iπ at will. The complex logarithm can only be single-valued on the cut plane. For example, ln i = iπ/2 or 5iπ/2 or −3iπ/2, etc.; and although i^{4} = 1, 4 ln i can be defined as 2iπ, or 10iπ or −6iπ, and so on.

Plots of the natural logarithm function on the complex plane (principal branch)

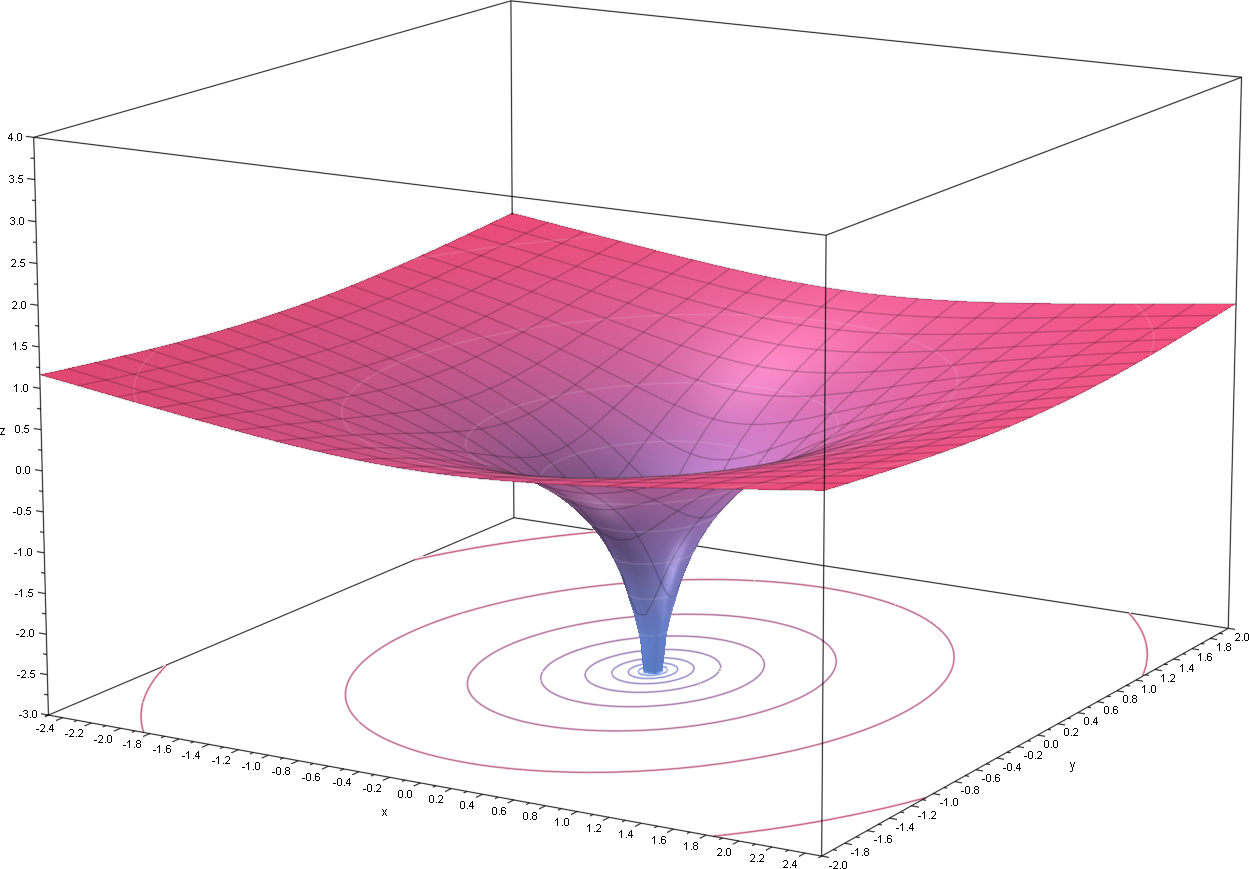
z = Re(ln(x + yi))

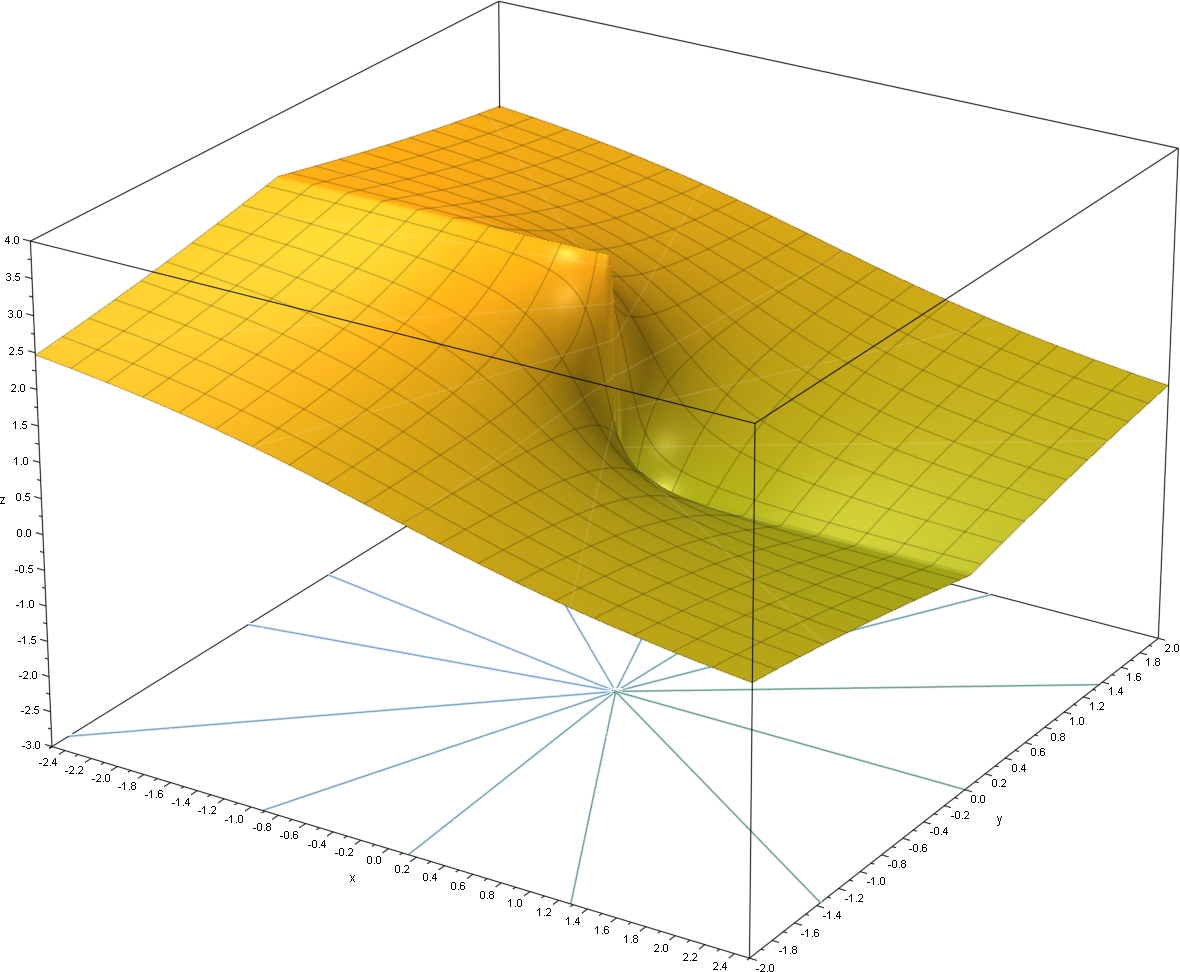
z = |(Im(ln(x + yi)))|

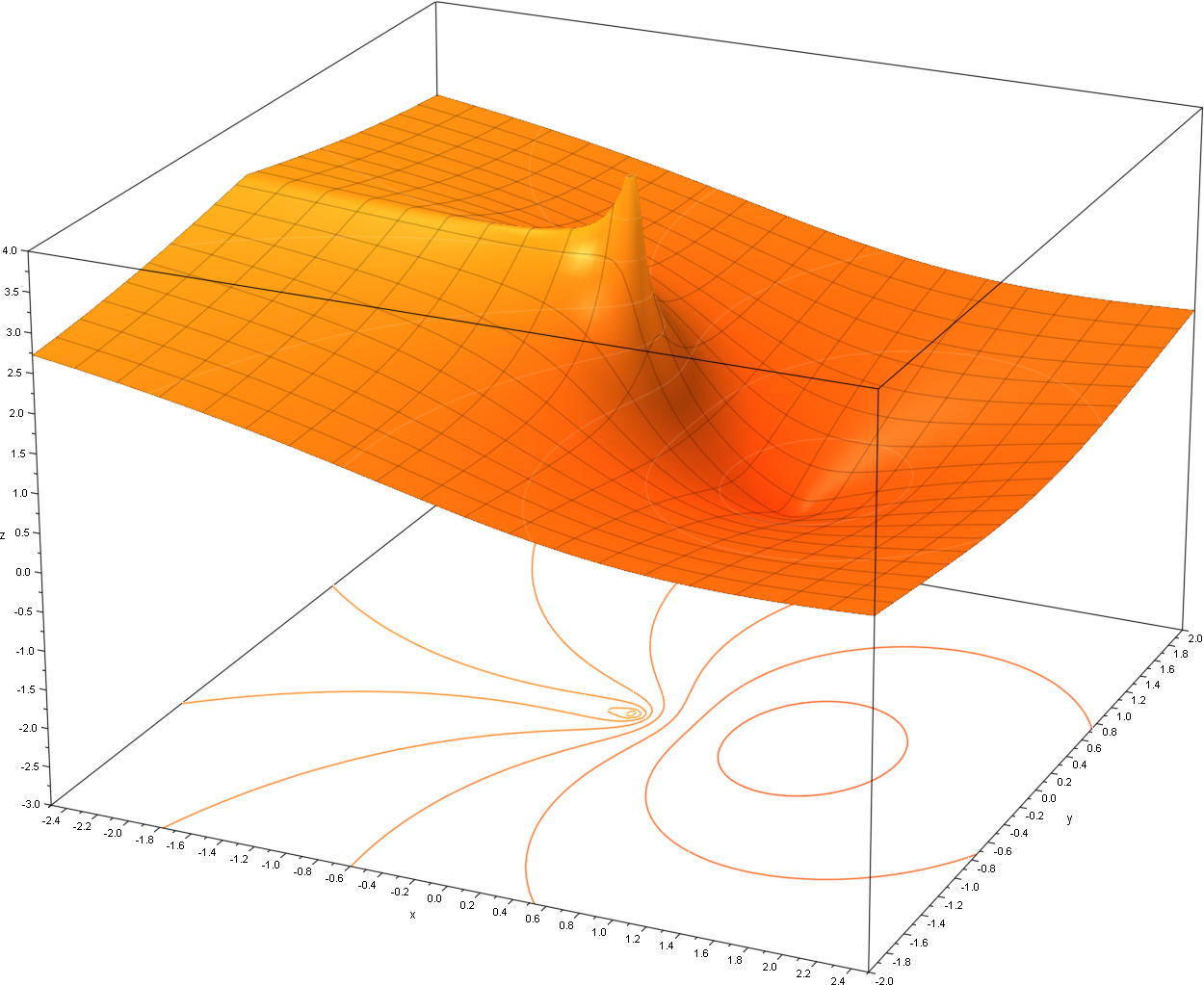
z = |(ln(x + yi))|

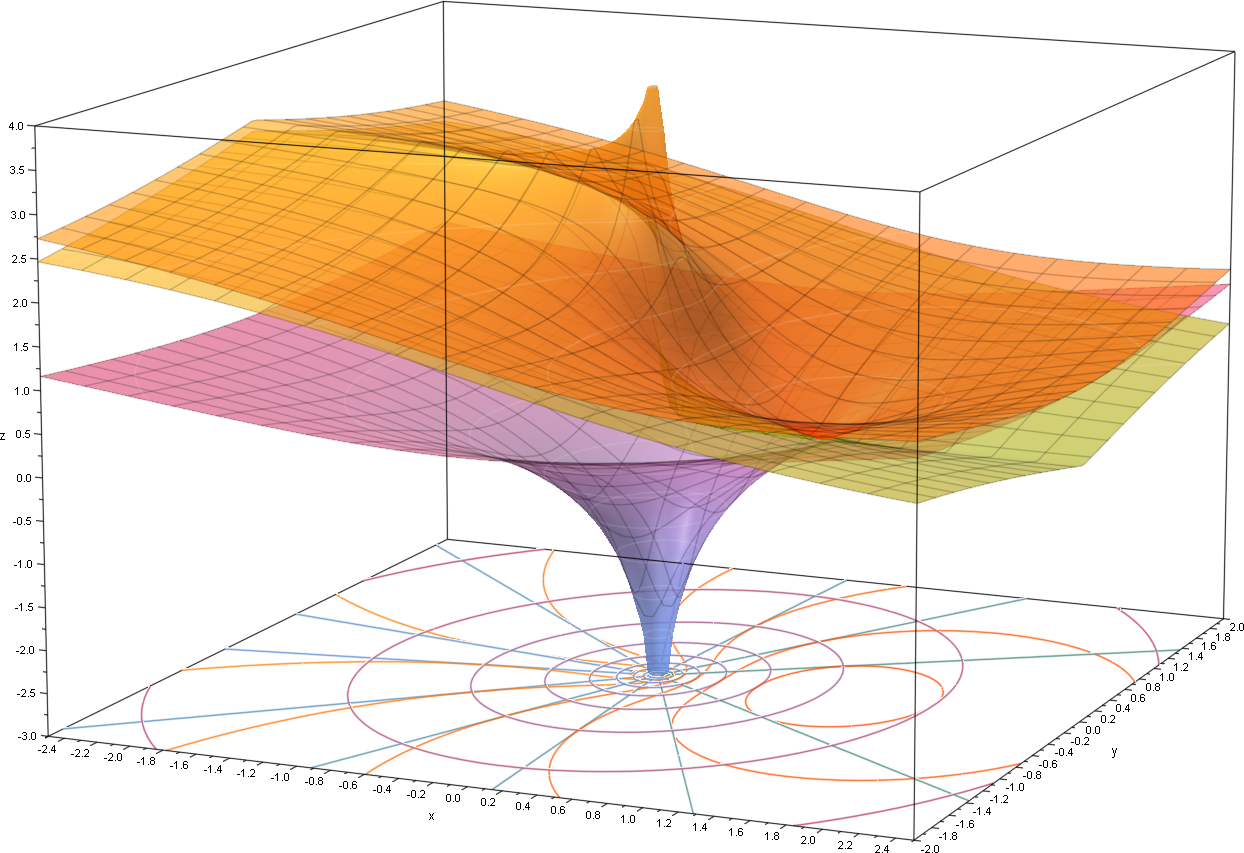
Superposition of the previous three graphs

== See also ==
- Iterated logarithm
- Napierian logarithm
- List of logarithmic identities
- Logarithm of a matrix
- Logarithmic coordinates of an element of a Lie group.
- Logarithmic differentiation
- Logarithmic integral function
- Nicholas Mercator – first to use the term natural logarithm
- Polylogarithm
- Von Mangoldt function
