= Vincent Léotaud =

French mathematician

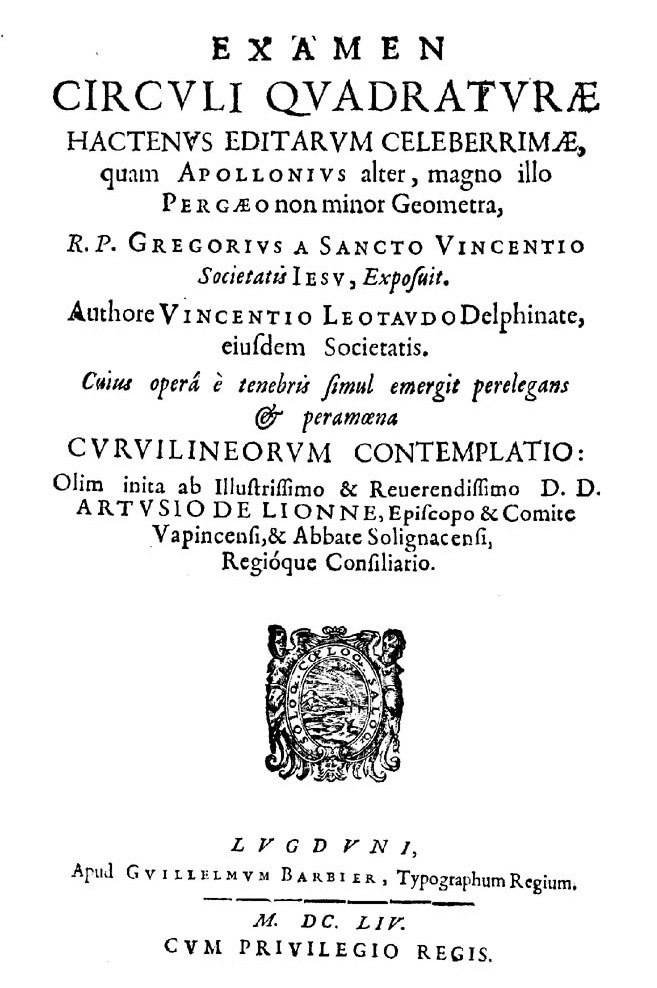
Examen circuli quadraturae (1654)

Vincent Léotaud (1595–1672) was a French Jesuit mathematician.

In his work Examen circuli quadraturae he affirmed the impossibility of squaring the circle, against the opinion of Grégoire de Saint-Vincent.

== Works ==
- Examen circuli quadraturae (in Latin). Vol. 1. Lyon: Guillaume Barbier. 1654.
- Examen circuli quadraturae (in Latin). Vol. 2. Lyon: Guillaume Barbier. 1654.
- Institutionum arithmeticarum libri quatuor (in Latin). Lyon: Guillaume Barbier. 1660.
- Cyclomathia seu Multiplex circuli contemplatio, tribus libris comprehensa (in Latin). Lyon: Benoit Coral. 1663.
- Magnetologia; in qua exponitur noua de magneticis philosophia (in Latin). Lyon: Laurent Anisson. 1668.
