= Logarithmic differentiation =

Method of mathematical differentiation

In calculus, logarithmic differentiation or differentiation by taking logarithms is a method used to differentiate functions by employing the logarithmic derivative of a function f, $(\ln f)' = \frac{f'}{f} \quad \implies \quad f' = f \cdot (\ln f)'.$

The technique is often performed in cases where it is easier to differentiate the logarithm of a function rather than the function itself. This usually occurs in cases where the function of interest is composed of a product of a number of parts, so that a logarithmic transformation will turn it into a sum of separate parts (which is much easier to differentiate). It can also be useful when applied to functions raised to the power of variables or functions. Logarithmic differentiation relies on the chain rule as well as properties of logarithms (in particular, the natural logarithm, or the logarithm to the base e) to transform products into sums and divisions into subtractions. The principle can be implemented, at least in part, in the differentiation of almost all differentiable functions, providing that these functions are non-zero.

== Overview ==
The method is used because the properties of logarithms provide avenues to quickly simplify complicated functions to be differentiated. These properties can be manipulated after the taking of natural logarithms on both sides and before the preliminary differentiation. The most commonly used logarithm laws are $\ln(ab) = \ln(a) + \ln(b), \qquad \ln\left(\frac{a}{b}\right) = \ln(a) - \ln(b), \qquad \ln(a^n) = n\ln(a).$

=== Higher order derivatives ===
Using Faà di Bruno's formula, the n-th order logarithmic derivative is, $\frac{d^n}{dx^n} \ln f(x) = \sum_{m_1+2m_2+\cdots+nm_n=n} \frac{n!}{m_1!\,m_2!\,\cdots\,m_n!} \cdot \frac{(-1)^{m_1+\cdots+m_n-1} (m_1 +\cdots + m_n-1)!}{f(x)^{m_1+\cdots+m_n}} \cdot \prod_{j=1}^n \left(\frac{f^{(j)}(x)}{j!}\right)^{m_j}.$ Using this, the first four derivatives are,
$$\begin{align}
\frac{d^2}{dx^2} \ln f(x) &= \frac{f''(x)}{f(x)} - \left(\frac{f'(x)}{f(x)} \right)^2 \\[1ex]
\frac{d^3}{dx^3} \ln f(x) &= \frac{f^{(3)}(x)}{f(x)} - 3 \frac{f'(x) f''(x)}{f(x)^2} + 2 \left(\frac{f'(x)}{f(x)} \right)^3 \\[1ex]
\frac{d^4}{dx^4} \ln f(x) &= \frac{f^{(4)}(x)}{f(x)} - 4 \frac{f'(x) f^{(3)}(x)}{f(x)^2} - 3 \left(\frac{f''(x)}{f(x)}\right)^2 + 12 \frac{f'(x)^2 f''(x)}{f(x)^3} - 6 \left(\frac{f'(x)}{f(x)} \right)^4
\end{align}$$

== Applications ==
=== Products ===
A natural logarithm is applied to a product of two functions $f(x) = g(x) h(x)$ to transform the product into a sum $\ln(f(x))=\ln(g(x)h(x)) = \ln(g(x)) + \ln(h(x)).$ Differentiating by applying the chain and the sum rules yields $\frac{f'(x)}{f(x)} = \frac{g'(x)}{g(x)} + \frac{h'(x)}{h(x)},$ and, after rearranging, yields $f'(x) = f(x)\times \left\{\frac{g'(x)}{g(x)} + \frac{h'(x)}{h(x)}\right\} = g(x) h(x) \times \left\{\frac{g'(x)}{g(x)} + \frac{h'(x)}{h(x)}\right\} = g'(x) h(x) + g(x) h'(x),$ which is the product rule for derivatives.

=== Quotients ===
A natural logarithm is applied to a quotient of two functions $f(x) = \frac{g(x)}{h(x)}$ to transform the division into a subtraction $\ln(f(x)) = \ln\left(\frac{g(x)}{h(x)}\right) = \ln(g(x)) - \ln(h(x))$ Differentiating by applying the chain and the sum rules yields $\frac{f'(x)}{f(x)} = \frac{g'(x)}{g(x)} - \frac{h'(x)}{h(x)},$ and, after rearranging, yields $f'(x) = f(x) \times \left\{\frac{g'(x)}{g(x)} - \frac{h'(x)}{h(x)}\right\} = \frac{g(x)}{h(x)} \times \left\{\frac{g'(x)}{g(x)} - \frac{h'(x)}{h(x)}\right\} = \frac{g'(x) h(x) - g(x) h'(x)}{h(x)^2},$

which is the quotient rule for derivatives.

=== Functional exponents ===
For a function of the form $f(x) = g(x)^{h(x)}$ the natural logarithm transforms the exponentiation into a product $\ln(f(x)) = \ln\left(g(x)^{h(x)}\right) = h(x) \ln(g(x))$ Differentiating by applying the chain and the product rules yields $\frac{f'(x)}{f(x)} = h'(x) \ln(g(x)) + h(x) \frac{g'(x)}{g(x)},$ and, after rearranging, yields $f'(x) = f(x)\times \left\{h'(x) \ln(g(x)) + h(x)\frac{g'(x)}{g(x)}\right\} = g(x)^{h(x)} \times \left\{h'(x) \ln(g(x)) + h(x) \frac{g'(x)}{g(x)}\right\}.$ The same result can be obtained by rewriting f in terms of exp and applying the chain rule.

==== General case ====
Using capital pi notation, let $f(x) = \prod_i (f_i(x))^{\alpha_i(x)}$ be a finite product of functions with functional exponents.

The application of natural logarithms results in (with capital sigma notation) $\ln (f(x)) = \sum_i\alpha_i(x) \cdot \ln(f_i(x)),$ and after differentiation, $\frac{f'(x)}{f(x)} = \sum_i \left[\alpha_i'(x)\cdot \ln(f_i(x)) + \alpha_i(x) \cdot \frac{f_i'(x)}{f_i(x)}\right].$ Rearrange to get the derivative of the original function, $f'(x) = \overbrace{\prod_i (f_i(x))^{\alpha_i(x)}}^{f(x)} \times\overbrace{\sum_i\left\{\alpha_i'(x)\cdot \ln(f_i(x))+\alpha_i(x)\cdot \frac{f_i'(x)}{f_i(x)}\right\}}^{[\ln (f(x))]'}.$

== See also ==
- Darboux derivative – derivative of a map between a manifold and a Lie group
- Generalizations of the derivative – Fundamental construction of differential calculus
- Lie group – Group that is also a differentiable manifold with group operations that are smooth
- List of logarithm topics
- List of logarithmic identities
- Maurer–Cartan form – Mathematical concept
