= Logarithmic convolution =

In mathematics, the scale convolution of two functions $s(t)$ and $r(t)$, also known as their logarithmic convolution or log-volution is defined as the function

$$s *_l r(t) = r *_l s(t) = \int_0^\infty s\left(\frac{t}{a}\right)r(a) \, \frac{da}{a}$$

when this quantity exists.

== Results ==
The logarithmic convolution can be related to the ordinary convolution by changing the variable from $t$ to $v = \log t$:

$$\begin{align}
s *_l r(t) & =  \int_0^\infty s \left(\frac{t}{a}\right)r(a) \, \frac{da}{a} \\
& =
\int_{-\infty}^\infty s\left(\frac{t}{e^u}\right) r(e^u) \, du \\
& =  \int_{-\infty}^\infty s \left(e^{\log t - u}\right)r(e^u) \, du.
\end{align}$$

Define $f(v) = s(e^v)$ and $g(v) = r(e^v)$ and let $v = \log t$, then

$$s *_l r(v) = f * g(v) = g * f(v) = r *_l s(v).$$

== See also ==
- Mellin transform
