= Alphonse Antonio de Sarasa =

Belgian mathematician (1618 to 1667)

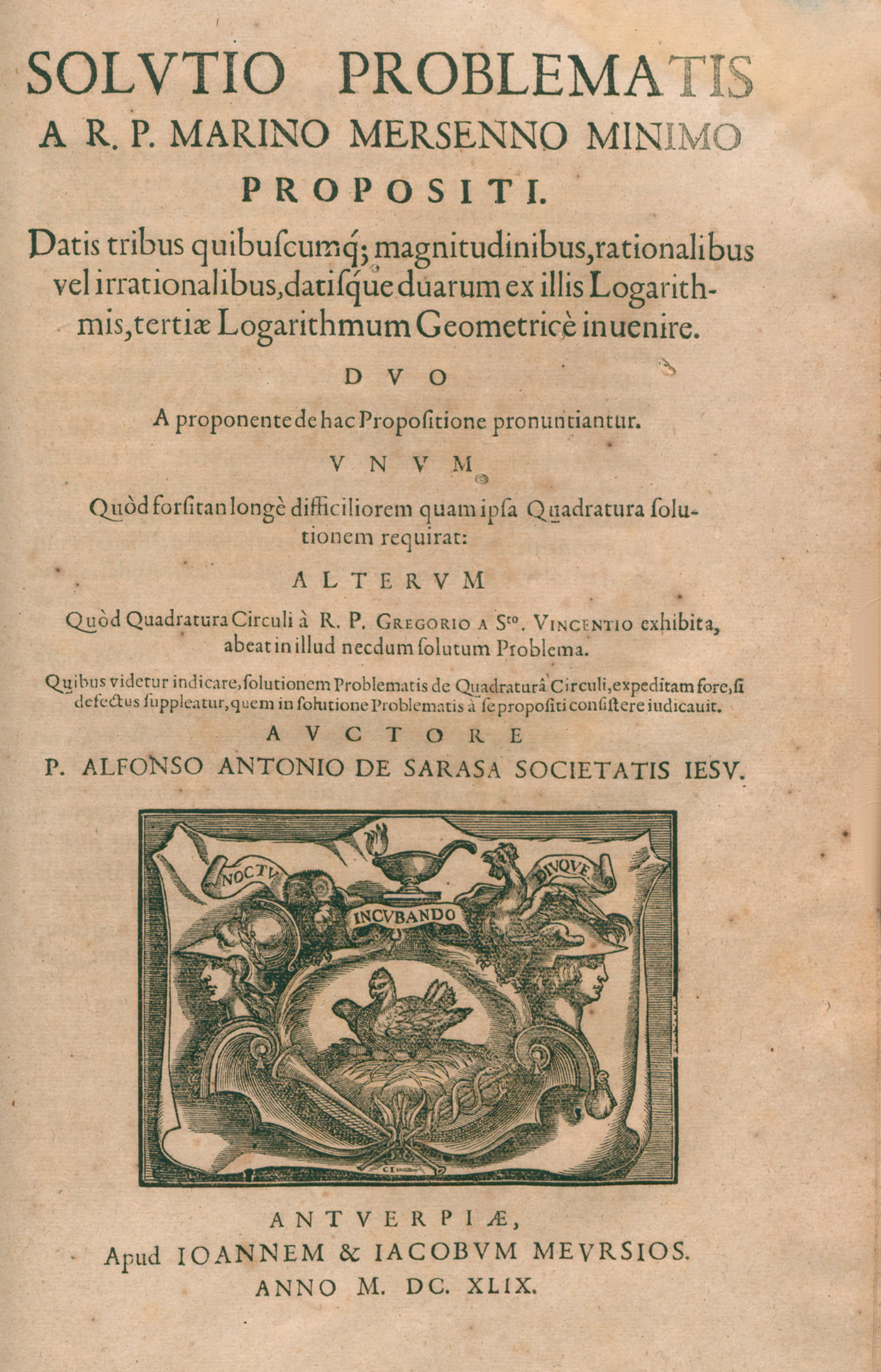
Solutio problematis a R. P. Marino Mersenno minimo propositi, 1649

Alphonse Antonio de Sarasa, SJ was a Jesuit mathematician who contributed to the understanding of logarithms, particularly as areas under a hyperbola.

== Biography ==
Alphonse de Sarasa was born in 1618, in Nieuwpoort in Flanders. In 1632 he was admitted as a novice in Ghent. It was there that he worked alongside Gregoire de Saint-Vincent whose ideas he developed, exploited, and promulgated. According to Sommervogel, Alphonse de Sarasa also held academic positions in Antwerp and Brussels.

In 1649 Alphonse de Sarasa published Solutio problematis a R.P. Marino Mersenne Minimo propositi. This book was in response to Marin Mersenne's pamphlet "Reflexiones Physico-mathematicae" which reviewed Saint-Vincent's Opus Geometricum and posed this challenge:

Given three arbitrary magnitudes, rational or irrational, and given the logarithms of the two, to find the logarithm of the third geometrically.

R.P. Burn explains that the term logarithm was used differently in the seventeenth century. Logarithms were any arithmetic progression which corresponded to a geometric progression. Burn says, in reviewing de Sarasa's popularization of de Saint-Vincent, and concurring with Moritz Cantor, that "the relationship between logarithms and the hyperbola was found by Saint-Vincent in all but name".

Burn quotes de Sarasa on this point: "…the foundation of the teaching embracing logarithms are contained" in Saint-Vincent's Opus Geometricum, part 4 of Book 6, de Hyperbola.

Alphonse Antonio de Sarasa died in Brussels in 1667.

== Works ==
Sarasa, Alfonso Antonio (1649). Solutio problematis a R. P. Marino Mersenno minimo propositi, datis tribus quibuscumq[ue] magnitudinibus, rationalibus vel irrationalibus, datisque duarum ex illis logarithmis, tertiae logarithmum geometricè invenire. Jan van Meurs, Jacob van Meurs.

== See also ==
- List of Roman Catholic scientist-clerics
