= Pantelides =

Pantelides may refer to:

- Leonidas Pantelides, Greek politician
- Mike Pantelides, American politician
- Sokrates Pantelides, American engineer
- Pantelides algorithm
