= Change of variables (PDE) =

Technique in partial differential evaluation

Often a partial differential equation can be reduced to a simpler form with a known solution by a suitable change of variables.

The article discusses change of variable for PDEs below in two ways:

1. by example;
2. by giving the theory of the method.

== Explanation by example ==
For example, the following simplified form of the Black–Scholes PDE

$$\frac{\partial V}{\partial t} + \frac{1}{2} S^2\frac{\partial^2 V}{\partial S^2} + S\frac{\partial V}{\partial S} - V = 0.$$

is reducible to the heat equation

$$\frac{\partial u}{\partial \tau} = \frac{\partial^2 u}{\partial x^2}$$

by the change of variables:

$$V(S,t) = v(x(S),\tau(t))$$
$$x(S) = \ln(S)$$
$$\tau(t) = \frac{1}{2} (T - t)$$
$$v(x,\tau)=\exp(-(1/2)x-(9/4)\tau) u(x,\tau)$$

in these steps:

- Replace $V(S,t)$ by $v(x(S),\tau(t))$ and apply the chain rule to get

$$\frac{1}{2}\left(-2v(x(S),\tau)+2 \frac{\partial\tau}{\partial t} \frac{\partial v}{\partial \tau} +S\left(\left(2 \frac{\partial x}{\partial S} + S\frac{\partial^2 x}{\partial S^2}\right)
\frac{\partial v}{\partial x} +
S \left(\frac{\partial x}{\partial S}\right)^2 \frac{\partial^2 v}{\partial x^2}\right)\right)=0.$$

- Replace $x(S)$ and $\tau(t)$ by $\ln(S)$ and $\frac{1}{2}(T-t)$ to get

$$\frac{1}{2}\left(
-2v(\ln(S),\frac{1}{2}(T-t))
-\frac{\partial v(\ln(S),\frac{1}{2}(T-t))}{\partial\tau}
+\frac{\partial v(\ln(S),\frac{1}{2}(T-t))}{\partial x}
+\frac{\partial^2 v(\ln(S),\frac{1}{2}(T-t))}{\partial x^2}\right)=0.$$

- Replace $\ln(S)$ and $\frac{1}{2}(T-t)$ by $x(S)$ and $\tau(t)$ and divide both sides by $\frac{1}{2}$ to get

$$-2 v-\frac{\partial v}{\partial\tau}+\frac{\partial v}{\partial x}+ \frac{\partial^2 v}{\partial x^2}=0.$$

- Replace $v(x,\tau)$ by $\exp(-(1/2)x-(9/4)\tau) u(x,\tau)$ and divide through by $-\exp(-(1/2)x-(9/4)\tau)$ to yield the heat equation.

Advice on the application of change of variable to PDEs is given by mathematician J. Michael Steele:

"There is nothing particularly difficult about changing variables and transforming one equation to another, but there is an element of tedium and complexity that slows us down. There is no universal remedy for this molasses effect, but the calculations do seem to go more quickly if one follows a well-defined plan. If we know that $V(S,t)$ satisfies an equation (like the Black–Scholes equation) we are guaranteed that we can make good use of the equation in the derivation of the equation for a new function $v(x,t)$ defined in terms of the old if we write the old V as a function of the new v and write the new $\tau$ and x as functions of the old t and S. This order of things puts everything in the direct line of fire of the chain rule; the partial derivatives $\frac{\partial V}{\partial t}$, $\frac{\partial V}{\partial S}$ and $\frac{\partial^2 V}{\partial S^2}$are easy to compute and at the end, the original equation stands ready for immediate use."

== Technique in general ==
Suppose that we have a function $u(x,t)$ and a change of variables $x_1,x_2$ such that there exist functions $a(x,t), b(x,t)$ such that

$$x_1=a(x,t)$$
$$x_2=b(x,t)$$

and functions $e(x_1,x_2),f(x_1,x_2)$ such that

$$x=e(x_1,x_2)$$
$$t=f(x_1,x_2)$$

and furthermore such that

$$x_1=a(e(x_1,x_2),f(x_1,x_2))$$
$$x_2=b(e(x_1,x_2),f(x_1,x_2))$$

and

$$x=e(a(x,t),b(x,t))$$
$$t=f(a(x,t),b(x,t))$$

In other words, it is helpful for there to be a bijection between the old set of variables and the new one, or else one has to

- Restrict the domain of applicability of the correspondence to a subject of the real plane which is sufficient for a solution of the practical problem at hand (where again it needs to be a bijection), and
- Enumerate the (zero or more finite list) of exceptions (poles) where the otherwise-bijection fails (and say why these exceptions don't restrict the applicability of the solution of the reduced equation to the original equation)

If a bijection does not exist then the solution to the reduced-form equation will not in general be a solution of the original equation.

We are discussing change of variable for PDEs. A PDE can be expressed as a differential operator applied to a function. Suppose $\mathcal{L}$ is a differential operator such that

$$\mathcal{L}u(x,t)=0$$

Then it is also the case that

$$\mathcal{L}v(x_1,x_2)=0$$

where

$$v(x_1,x_2)=u(e(x_1,x_2),f(x_1,x_2))$$

and we operate as follows to go from $\mathcal{L}u(x,t)=0$ to $\mathcal{L}v(x_1,x_2)=0:$

- Apply the chain rule to $\mathcal{L} v(x_1(x,t),x_2(x,t))=0$ and expand out giving equation $e_1$.
- Substitute $a(x,t)$ for $x_1(x,t)$ and $b(x,t)$ for $x_2(x,t)$ in $e_1$ and expand out giving equation $e_2$.
- Replace occurrences of $x$ by $e(x_1,x_2)$ and $t$ by $f(x_1,x_2)$ to yield $\mathcal{L}v(x_1,x_2)=0$, which will be free of $x$ and $t$.

In the context of PDEs, Weizhang Huang and Robert D. Russell define and explain the different possible time-dependent transformations in details.

== Action-angle coordinates ==
Often, theory can establish the existence of a change of variables, although the formula itself cannot be explicitly stated. For an integrable Hamiltonian system of dimension $n$, with $\dot{x}_i = \partial H/\partial p_j$ and $\dot{p}_j = - \partial H/\partial x_j$, there exist $n$ integrals $I_i$. There exists a change of variables from the coordinates $\{ x_1, \dots, x_n, p_1, \dots, p_n \}$ to a set of variables $\{ I_1, \dots I_n, \varphi_1, \dots, \varphi_n \}$, in which the equations of motion become $\dot{I}_i = 0$, $\dot{\varphi}_i = \omega_i(I_1, \dots, I_n)$, where the functions $\omega_1, \dots, \omega_n$ are unknown, but depend only on $I_1, \dots, I_n$. The variables $I_1, \dots, I_n$ are the action coordinates, the variables $\varphi_1, \dots, \varphi_n$ are the angle coordinates. The motion of the system can thus be visualized as rotation on torii. As a particular example, consider the simple harmonic oscillator, with $\dot{x} = 2p$ and $\dot{p} = - 2x$, with Hamiltonian $H(x,p) = x^2 + p^2$. This system can be rewritten as $\dot{I} = 0$, $\dot{\varphi} = 1$, where $I$ and $\varphi$ are the canonical polar coordinates: $I = p^2 + q^2$ and $\tan(\varphi) = p/x$. See V. I. Arnold, `Mathematical Methods of Classical Mechanics', for more details.
