= Frobenius theorem (real division algebras) =

Theorem in abstract algebra

In mathematics, more specifically in abstract algebra, the Frobenius theorem, proved by Ferdinand Georg Frobenius in 1877, characterizes the finite-dimensional associative division algebras over the real numbers. According to the theorem, every such algebra is isomorphic to one of the following:

- R (the real numbers),
- C (the complex numbers), or
- H (the quaternions).

These algebras have real dimension 1, 2, and 4, respectively. Of these three algebras, R and C are commutative, but H is not.

== Proof ==
The main ingredients for the following proof are the Cayley–Hamilton theorem and the fundamental theorem of algebra.

=== Introducing some notation ===
- Let D be the division algebra in question.
- Let n be the dimension of D.
- We identify the real multiples of 1 with R.
- When we write a ≤ 0 for an element a of D, we imply that a is contained in R.
- We can consider D as a finite-dimensional R-vector space. Any element d of D defines an endomorphism of D by left-multiplication, we identify d with that endomorphism. Therefore, we can speak about the trace of d, and its characteristic- and minimal polynomials.
- For any z in C define the following real quadratic polynomial:

$$Q(z; x) = x^2 - 2\operatorname{Re}(z)x + |z|^2 = (x-z)(x-\overline{z}) \in \mathbf{R}[x].$$

Note that if z ∈ C ∖ R then Q(z; x) is irreducible over R.

=== The claim ===
The key to the argument is the following

Claim. The set V of all elements a of D such that a^{2} ≤ 0 is a vector subspace of D of dimension n − 1. Moreover D = R ⊕ V as R-vector spaces, which implies that V generates D as an algebra.

Proof of Claim: Pick a in D with characteristic polynomial p(x). By the fundamental theorem of algebra, we can write

$$p(x) = (x-t_1)\cdots(x-t_r) (x-z_1)(x - \overline{z_1}) \cdots (x-z_s)(x - \overline{z_s}), \qquad t_i \in \mathbf{R}, \quad z_j \in \mathbf{C} \setminus \mathbf{R}.$$

We can rewrite p(x) in terms of the polynomials Q(z; x):

$$p(x) = (x-t_1)\cdots(x-t_r) Q(z_1; x) \cdots Q(z_s; x).$$

Since z_{j} ∈ C ∖ R, the polynomials Q(z_{j}; x) are all irreducible over R. By the Cayley–Hamilton theorem, p(a) = 0 and because D is a division algebra, it follows that either a − t_{i} = 0 for some i or that Q(z_{j}; a) = 0 for some j. The first case implies that a is real. In the second case, it follows that Q(z_{j}; x) is the minimal polynomial of a. Because p(x) has the same complex roots as the minimal polynomial and because it is real it follows that

$$p(x) = Q(z_j; x)^k = \left(x^2 - 2\operatorname{Re}(z_j) x + |z_j|^2 \right)^k$$

for some k. Since p(x) is the characteristic polynomial of a the coefficient of x^{2k − 1} in p(x) is tr(a) up to a sign. Therefore, we read from the above equation we have: tr(a) = 0 if and only if Re(z_{j}) = 0, in other words tr(a) = 0 if and only if a^{2} = −|z_{j}|^{2} < 0.

So V is the subset of all a with tr(a) = 0. In particular, it is a vector subspace. The rank–nullity theorem then implies that V has dimension n − 1 since it is the kernel of $\operatorname{tr} : D \to \mathbf{R}$. Since R and V are disjoint (i.e. they satisfy $\mathbf R \cap V = \{0\}$), and their dimensions sum to n, we have that D = R ⊕ V.

=== The finish ===
For a, b in V define B(a, b) = (−ab − ba)/2. Because of the identity (a + b)^{2} − a^{2} − b^{2} = ab + ba, it follows that B(a, b) is real. Furthermore, since a^{2} ≤ 0, we have: B(a, a) > 0 for a ≠ 0. Thus B is a positive-definite symmetric bilinear form, in other words, an inner product on V.

Let W be a subspace of V that generates D as an algebra and which is minimal with respect to this property. Let e_{1}, ..., e_{k} be an orthonormal basis of W with respect to B. Then orthonormality implies that:

$$e_i^2 =-1, \quad e_i e_j = - e_j e_i.$$

The form of D then depends on k:

If k = 0, then D is isomorphic to R.

If k = 1, then D is generated by 1 and e_{1} subject to the relation e^{2}_{1} = −1. Hence it is isomorphic to C.

If k = 2, it has been shown above that D is generated by 1, e_{1}, e_{2} subject to the relations

$$e_1^2 = e_2^2 =-1, \quad e_1 e_2 = - e_2 e_1, \quad (e_1 e_2)(e_1 e_2) =-1.$$

These are precisely the relations for H.

If k > 2, then D cannot be a division algebra. Assume that k > 2. Define u = e_{1}e_{2}e_{k} and consider u^{2}=(e_{1}e_{2}e_{k})*(e_{1}e_{2}e_{k}). By rearranging the elements of this expression and applying the orthonormality relations among the basis elements we find that u^{2} = 1. If D were a division algebra, 0 = u^{2} − 1 = (u − 1)(u + 1) implies u = ±1, which in turn means: e_{k} = ∓e_{1}e_{2} and so e_{1}, ..., e_{k−1} generate D. This contradicts the minimality of W.

== Remarks and related results ==
- The fact that D is generated by e_{1}, ..., e_{k} subject to the above relations means that D is the Clifford algebra of R^{n}. The last step shows that the only real Clifford algebras which are division algebras are Cℓ^{0}, Cℓ^{1} and Cℓ^{2}.
- As a consequence, the only commutative division algebras are R and C. Also note that H is not a C-algebra. If it were, then the center of H has to contain C, but the center of H is R.
- This theorem is closely related to Hurwitz's theorem, which states that the only real normed division algebras are R, C, H, and the (non-associative) algebra O.
- Pontryagin variant. If D is a connected, locally compact division ring, then D = R, C, or H.

== See also ==
- Hurwitz's theorem, classifying normed real division algebras
- Gelfand–Mazur theorem, classifying complex complete division algebras
- Ostrowski's theorem
