= Pantelides algorithm =

Pantelides algorithm in mathematics is a systematic method for reducing high-index systems of differential-algebraic equations to lower index. This is accomplished by selectively adding differentiated forms of the equations already present in the system. It is possible for the algorithm to fail in some instances.

Pantelides algorithm is implemented in several significant equation-based simulation programs such as gPROMS, Modelica and EMSO.
