= Sokrates Pantelides =

Sokrates Pantelides (born November 20, 1948) is an American physicist and electrical engineer of Cypriot Greek origin who works at Vanderbilt University, Nashville, Tennessee. He was named Fellow of the Institute of Electrical and Electronics Engineers (IEEE) in 2015 for contributions to point-defect dynamics in semiconductor devices.
