= Wahba's problem =

Applied mathematics problem

In applied mathematics, Wahba's problem, first posed by Grace Wahba in 1965, seeks to find a rotation matrix (special orthogonal matrix) between two coordinate systems from a set of (weighted) vector observations. Solutions to Wahba's problem are often used in satellite attitude determination utilising sensors such as magnetometers and multi-antenna GPS receivers. The cost function that Wahba's problem seeks to minimise is as follows:

$J(\mathbf{R}) = \frac{1}{2} \sum_{k=1}^{N} a_k\| \mathbf{w}_k - \mathbf{R} \mathbf{v}_k \|^2$ for $N\geq2$

where $\mathbf{w}_k$ is the k-th 3-vector measurement in the reference frame, $\mathbf{v}_k$ is the corresponding k-th 3-vector measurement in the body frame and $\mathbf{R}$ is a 3 by 3 rotation matrix between the coordinate frames. $a_k$ is an optional set of weights for each observation.

A number of solutions to the problem have appeared in literature, notably Davenport's q-method, QUEST and methods based on the singular value decomposition (SVD). Several methods for solving Wahba's problem are discussed by Markley and Mortari.

This is an alternative formulation of the orthogonal Procrustes problem (consider all the vectors multiplied by the square-roots of the corresponding weights as columns of two matrices with N columns to obtain the alternative formulation). A compact and elegant derivation can be found in Appel (2015).

== Solution via SVD ==
One solution can be found using a singular value decomposition (SVD).

1. Obtain a matrix $\mathbf{B}$ as follows:

$$\mathbf{B} = \sum_{i=1}^{n} a_i \mathbf{w}_i {\mathbf{v}_i}^T$$

2. Find the singular value decomposition of $\mathbf{B}$

$$\mathbf{B} = \mathbf{U} \mathbf{S} \mathbf{V}^T$$

3. The rotation matrix is simply:

$$\mathbf{R} = \mathbf{U} \mathbf{M} \mathbf{V}^T$$

where
$$\mathbf{M} = \operatorname{diag}(\begin{bmatrix} 1 & 1 & \det(\mathbf{U}) \det(\mathbf{V})\end{bmatrix})$$

== Geometric interpretation using quaternion circles ==
A geometric interpretation of Wahba’s problem using unit quaternions was presented by Liu, et al. (2026)

For unit vector observations, each correspondence $\mathbf{R}\mathbf{v}_k=\mathbf{w}_k$ defines a circle of admissible quaternions, called a ''quaternion circle''. To see this, choose any unit quaternion $\mathbf{q}_k$ whose rotation maps $\mathbf{v}_k$ to $\mathbf{w}_k$. Every other rotation satisfying this correspondence is obtained by subsequently rotating about $\mathbf{w}_k$. With scalar-first quaternions and Hamilton multiplication $\otimes$, the corresponding quaternion can therefore be written as
$$\mathbf{q}_k(\theta)
=\left(\cos\frac{\theta}{2},\mathbf w_k\sin\frac{\theta}{2}\right)\otimes \mathbf{q}_k
=\mathbf{q}_k\cos\frac{\theta}{2}+\mathbf{p}_k\sin\frac{\theta}{2},
\qquad \mathbf{p}_k=(0,\mathbf w_k)\otimes \mathbf{q}_k.$$
Quaternion multiplication preserves norms, and $\mathbf{q}_k^T\mathbf{p}_k=0$. Thus $\mathbf{p}_k$ and $\mathbf{q}_k$ are orthonormal vectors in $\mathbb{R}^4$, and the complete set of admissible quaternions forms a great circle; this arises from the 2-to-1 mapping from unit quaternions to rotation matrices.

For mutually consistent observations, the solution lies at the common intersection of these circles. Two correspondences with non-collinear source vectors determine a unique rotation, represented by two antipodal intersection points. With measurement noise, the circles need not have a common intersection.

The same geometry gives a linear least-squares formulation. Let the rows of $A_k\in\mathbb R^{2\times4}$ form an orthonormal basis for the orthogonal complement of the subspace spanned by $\mathbf{p}_k$ and $\mathbf{q}_k$. Therefore, each exact correspondence is equivalent to
$$\mathbf{R}\mathbf{v}_k=\mathbf{w}_k\Longrightarrow
\begin{cases}A_k\mathbf{q}=0\\ \mathbf{q}^T\mathbf{q}=1\end{cases}$$
which yields a classical linear formulation subject to a unit-norm constraint.

== See also ==
- Triad method
- Kabsch algorithm
- Orthogonal Procrustes problem
