= Malcolm D. Shuster =

American physicist and aerospace engineer

Malcolm Shuster in 2005

Malcolm D. Shuster (31 July 1943 – 23 February 2012) was an American physicist and aerospace engineer, whose work contributed significantly to spacecraft attitude determination. In 1977 he joined the Attitude Systems Operation of the Computer Sciences Corporation in Silver Spring, Maryland, during which time he developed the QUaternion ESTimator (QUEST) algorithm for static attitude determination. He later, with F. Landis Markley, helped to develop the standard implementation of the Kalman filter used in spacecraft attitude estimation. During his career, he authored roughly fifty technical papers on subjects in physics and spacecraft engineering, many of which have become seminal within the field of attitude estimation; his 1993 "A survey of attitude representations" is still the canonical reference. He held teaching assignments at Johns Hopkins University, Howard University, Carnegie-Mellon University and Tel-Aviv University. In 2000 the American Astronautical Society awarded him the Dirk Brouwer Award. In June 2005 the American Astronautical Society held a special three-day Astronautics symposium in his honor
