= Rank (differential topology) =

In mathematics, the rank of a differentiable map $f:M\to N$ between differentiable manifolds at a point $p\in M$ is the rank of the derivative of $f$ at $p$. Recall that the derivative of $f$ at $p$ is a linear map

$$d_p f : T_p M \to T_{f(p)}N\,$$

from the tangent space at p to the tangent space at f(p). As a linear map between vector spaces it has a well-defined rank, which is just the dimension of the image in T_{f(p)}N:

$$\operatorname{rank}(f)_p = \dim(\operatorname{im}(d_p f)).$$

== Constant rank maps ==
A differentiable map f : M → N is said to have constant rank if the rank of f is the same for all p in M. Constant rank maps have a number of nice properties and are an important concept in differential topology.

Three special cases of constant rank maps occur. A constant rank map f : M → N is

- an immersion if rank f = dim M (i.e. the derivative is everywhere injective),
- a submersion if rank f = dim N (i.e. the derivative is everywhere surjective),
- a local diffeomorphism if rank f = dim M = dim N (i.e. the derivative is everywhere bijective).

The map f itself need not be injective, surjective, or bijective for these conditions to hold; only the behavior of the derivative is important. For example, there are injective maps which are not immersions and immersions which are not injections. However, if f : M → N is a smooth map of constant rank then

- if f is injective it is an immersion,
- if f is surjective it is a submersion,
- if f is bijective it is a diffeomorphism.

Constant rank maps have a nice description in terms of local coordinates. Suppose M and N are smooth manifolds of dimensions m and n respectively, and f : M → N is a smooth map with constant rank k. Then for all p in M there exist coordinates (x^{1}, ..., x^{m}) centered at p and coordinates (y^{1}, ..., y^{n}) centered at f(p) such that f is given by

$$f(x^1,\ldots,x^m) = (x^1,\ldots, x^k,0,\ldots,0)\,$$

in these coordinates.

== Examples ==
Gimbal lock occurs because the map T^{3} → RP^{3} does not have rank 3 at all points. This animation shows a set of three gimbals mounted together to allow three degrees of freedom generically (rank 3 at regular points). When all three gimbals are lined up (in the same plane), the system can only move in two dimensions from this configuration, not three – it has rank 2 at such a singular point – and is in gimbal lock. In this case it can pitch or yaw, but not roll (rotate in the plane that the axes all lie in).

Maps whose rank is generically maximal, but drops at certain singular points, occur frequently in coordinate systems. For example, in spherical coordinates, the rank of the map from the two angles to a point on the sphere (formally, a map T^{2} → S^{2} from the torus to the sphere) is 2 at regular points, but is only 1 at the north and south poles (zenith and nadir).

A subtler example occurs in charts on SO(3), the rotation group. This group occurs widely in engineering, due to 3-dimensional rotations being heavily used in navigation, nautical engineering, and aerospace engineering, among many other uses. Topologically, SO(3) is the real projective space RP^{3}, and it is often desirable to represent rotations by a set of three numbers, known as Euler angles (in numerous variants), both because this is conceptually simple, and because one can build a combination of three gimbals to produce rotations in three dimensions. Topologically this corresponds to a map from the 3-torus T^{3} of three angles to the real projective space RP^{3} of rotations, but this map does not have rank 3 at all points (formally because it cannot be a covering map, as the only (non-trivial) covering space is the hypersphere S^{3}), and the phenomenon of the rank dropping to 2 at certain points is referred to in engineering as gimbal lock.
