= Axes conventions =

Location and orientation references

Heading, elevation and bank angles (Z-Y’-X’’) for an aircraft. The aircraft's pitch and yaw axes Y and Z are not shown, and its fixed reference frame xyz has been shifted backwards from its center of gravity (preserving angles) for clarity. Axes named according to the air norm DIN 9300

In ballistics and flight dynamics, axes conventions are standardized ways of establishing the location and orientation of coordinate axes for use as a frame of reference. Mobile objects are normally tracked from an external frame considered fixed. Other frames can be defined on those mobile objects to deal with relative positions for other objects. Finally, attitudes or orientations can be described by a relationship between the external frame and the one defined over the mobile object.

The orientation of a vehicle is normally referred to as attitude. It is described normally by the orientation of a frame fixed in the body relative to a fixed reference frame. The attitude is described by attitude coordinates, and consists of at least three coordinates.

While from a geometrical point of view the different methods to describe orientations are defined using only some reference frames, in engineering applications it is important also to describe how these frames are attached to the lab and the body in motion.

Due to the special importance of international conventions in air vehicles, several organizations have published standards to be followed. For example, German DIN has published the DIN 9300 norm for aircraft (adopted by ISO as ISO 1151–2:1985).

== Earth bounded axes conventions ==
Representation of the Earth with parallels and meridians

=== World reference frames: ENU and NED ===
Basically, as lab frame or reference frame, there are two kinds of conventions for the frames:

- East, North, Up (ENU), used in geography
- North, East, Down (NED), used specially in aerospace

This frame referenced w.r.t. Global Reference frames like Earth Center Earth Fixed (ECEF) non-inertial system.

==== World reference frames for attitude description ====
To establish a standard convention to describe attitudes, it is required to establish at least the axes of the reference system and the axes of the rigid body or vehicle. When an ambiguous notation system is used (such as Euler angles) the convention used should also be stated. Nevertheless, most used notations (matrices and quaternions) are unambiguous.

Earth Centered Earth Fixed and East, North, Up coordinates.

Tait–Bryan angles are often used to describe a vehicle's attitude with respect to a chosen reference frame, though any other notation can be used. The positive x-axis in vehicles points always in the direction of movement. For positive y- and z-axis, we have to face two different conventions:

- In case of land vehicles like cars, tanks etc., which use the ENU-system (East-North-Up) as external reference (World frame), the vehicle's (body's) positive y- or pitch axis always points to its left, and the positive z- or yaw axis always points up. World frame's origin is fixed at the center of gravity of the vehicle.
- By contrast, in case of air and sea vehicles like submarines, ships, airplanes etc., which use the NED-system (North-East-Down) as external reference (World frame), the vehicle's (body's) positive y- or pitch axis always points to its right, and its positive z- or yaw axis always points down. World frame's origin is fixed at the center of gravity of the vehicle.
- Finally, in case of space vehicles like the Space Shuttle etc., a modification of the latter convention is used, where the vehicle's (body's) positive y- or pitch axis again always points to its right, and its positive z- or yaw axis always points down, but “down” now may have two different meanings: If a so-called local frame is used as external reference, its positive z-axis points “down” to the center of the Earth as it does in case of the earlier mentioned NED-system, but if the inertial frame is used as reference, its positive z-axis will point now to the north celestial pole, and its positive x-axis to the Vernal Equinox or some other reference meridian.

=== Frames mounted on vehicles ===
Specially for aircraft, these frames do not need to agree with the earth-bound frames in the up-down line. It must be agreed what ENU and NED mean in this context.

==== Conventions for land vehicles ====
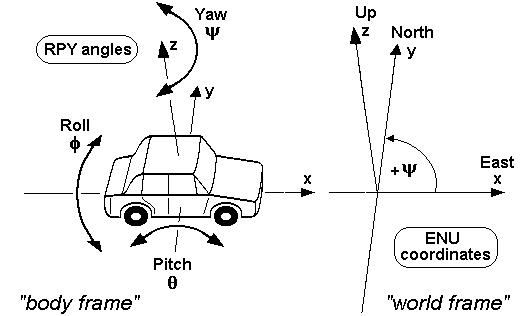
RPY angles of cars and other land vehicles

For land vehicles it is rare to describe their complete orientation, except when speaking about electronic stability control or satellite navigation. In this case, the convention is normally the one of the adjacent drawing, where RPY stands for roll-pitch-yaw.

==== Conventions for sea vehicles ====
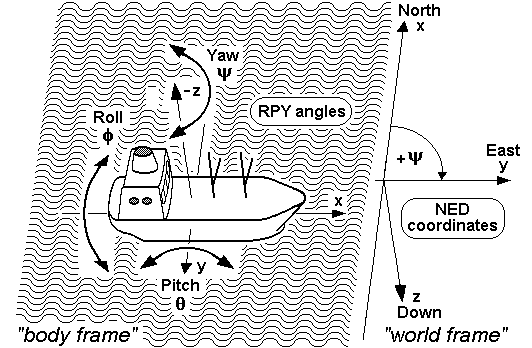
RPY angles of ships and other sea vehicles

As well as aircraft, the same terminology is used for the motion of ships and boats. Some words commonly used were introduced in maritime navigation. For example, the yaw angle or heading, has a nautical origin, with the meaning of "bending out of the course". Etymologically, it is related with the verb 'to go'. It is related to the concept of bearing. It is typically assigned the shorthand notation ψ.

==== Conventions for aircraft local reference frames ====
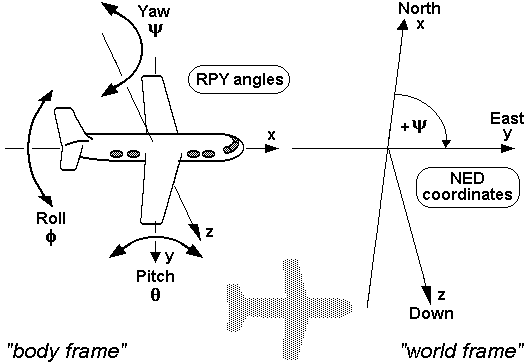
RPY angles of airplanes and other air vehicles

Mnemonics to remember angle names

Coordinates to describe an aircraft attitude (Heading, Elevation and Bank) are normally given relative to a reference control frame located in a control tower, and therefore ENU, relative to the position of the control tower on the earth surface.

Coordinates to describe observations made from an aircraft are normally given relative to its intrinsic axes, but normally using as positive the coordinate pointing downwards, where the interesting points are located. Therefore, they are normally NED.

These axes are normally taken so that X axis is the longitudinal axis pointing ahead, Z axis is the vertical axis pointing downwards, and the Y axis is the lateral one, pointing in such a way that the frame is right-handed.

The motion of an aircraft is often described in terms of rotation about these axes, so rotation about the X-axis is called rolling, rotation about the Y-axis is called pitching, and rotation about the Z-axis is called yawing.

== Frames for space navigation ==
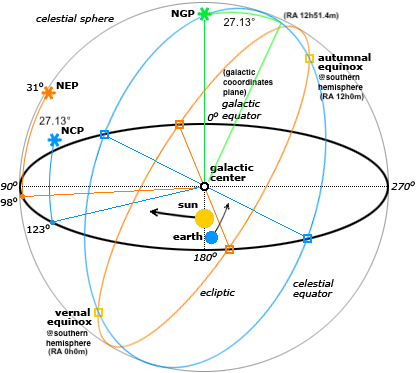
Different reference systems for coordinates in space

For satellites orbiting the Earth it is normal to use the Equatorial coordinate system. The projection of the Earth's equator onto the celestial sphere is called the celestial equator. Similarly, the projections of the Earth's north and south geographic poles become the north and south celestial poles, respectively.

Deep space satellites use other Celestial coordinate system, like the Ecliptic coordinate system.

=== Local conventions for space ships as satellites ===
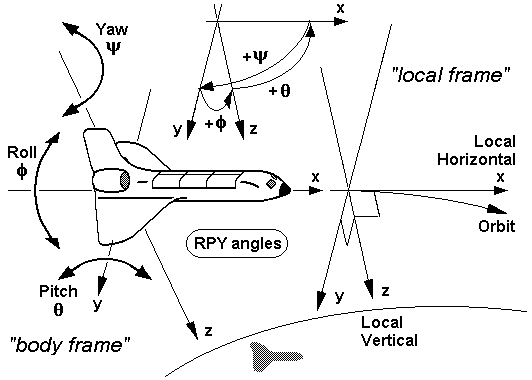
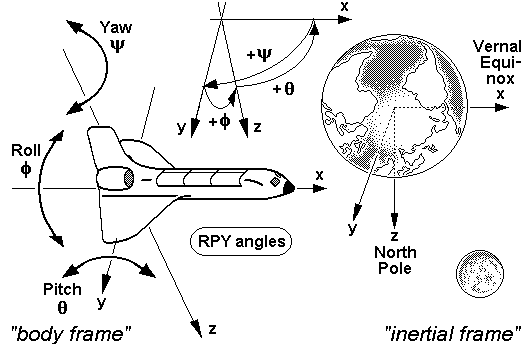
RPY angles of the Space Shuttle and other space vehicles, first using a local frame as reference and second using an inertial frame as reference.

If the goal is to keep the shuttle during its orbits in a constant attitude with respect to the sky, e.g. in order to perform certain astronomical observations, the preferred reference is the inertial frame, and the RPY angle vector (0|0|0) describes an attitude then, where the shuttle's wings are kept permanently parallel to the Earth's equator, its nose points permanently to the vernal equinox, and its belly towards the northern polar star (see picture). (Note that rockets and missiles more commonly follow the conventions for aircraft where the RPY angle vector (0|0|0) points north, rather than toward the vernal equinox).

On the other hand, if the goal is to keep the shuttle during its orbits in a constant attitude with respect to the surface of the Earth, the preferred reference will be the local frame, with the RPY angle vector (0|0|0) describing an attitude where the shuttle's wings are parallel to the Earth's surface, its nose points to its heading, and its belly down towards the centre of the Earth (see picture).

== Frames used to describe attitudes ==
Normally the frames used to describe a vehicle's local observations are the same frames used to describe its attitude with respect to the ground tracking stations. i.e. if an ENU frame is used in a tracking station, also ENU frames are used onboard and these frames are also used to refer local observations.

An important case in which this does not apply is aircraft. Aircraft observations are performed downwards and therefore normally NED axes convention applies. Nevertheless, when attitudes with respect to ground stations are given, a relationship between the local earth-bound frame and the onboard ENU frame is used.

== See also ==
- Aircraft principal axes
- Attitude dynamics and control (spacecraft)
- Euler's rotation theorem
- Gyroscope
- Triad Method
- Rotation formalisms in three dimensions
- Geographic coordinate system
- Astronomical coordinate systems
