= Edelstein, Illinois =

Edelstein
- Unincorporated community
- Location of Edelstein Edelstein (Illinois)
- Coordinates: 40°56′25″N 89°38′00″W
- Country: United States
- State: Illinois
- County: Peoria
- Time zone: UTC-6 (CST)
  - Summer (DST): UTC-5 (CDT)
- ZIP Code: 61526
- Area code: 309
- Telephone prefix: 249

Edelstein is an unincorporated village just off Illinois Route 40 in Peoria County, Illinois, 17.15 miles (27.60 km) north of Peoria City Hall, approximately 7.5 miles (12.1 km) north of the city limits of Peoria and 7.5 miles (12.1 km) west of Chillicothe.

Edelstein's main business is a manufacturing company named International Supply Company, which owns several blocks of the village.

Edelstein is located on a mainline railroad grade on the BNSF Railway's Chillicothe Subdivision. The crest of the grade is just east of town, where the incline is referred to as "Edelstein Hill".

== History ==
A post office has been in operation at Edelstein since 1888. The community's name honors John Edelstein, a railroad official.

On June 25, 2009, the historic Hub Ballroom was destroyed by fire. Built in 1938, this building hosted celebrity appearances by Glenn Miller, Guy Lombardo, Jerry Lee Lewis, and others.

== Notable residents ==
- Clarence W. Spicer, inventor of the Spicer joint
