= M3 Lee =

American medium tank of World War II

Medium Tank, M3
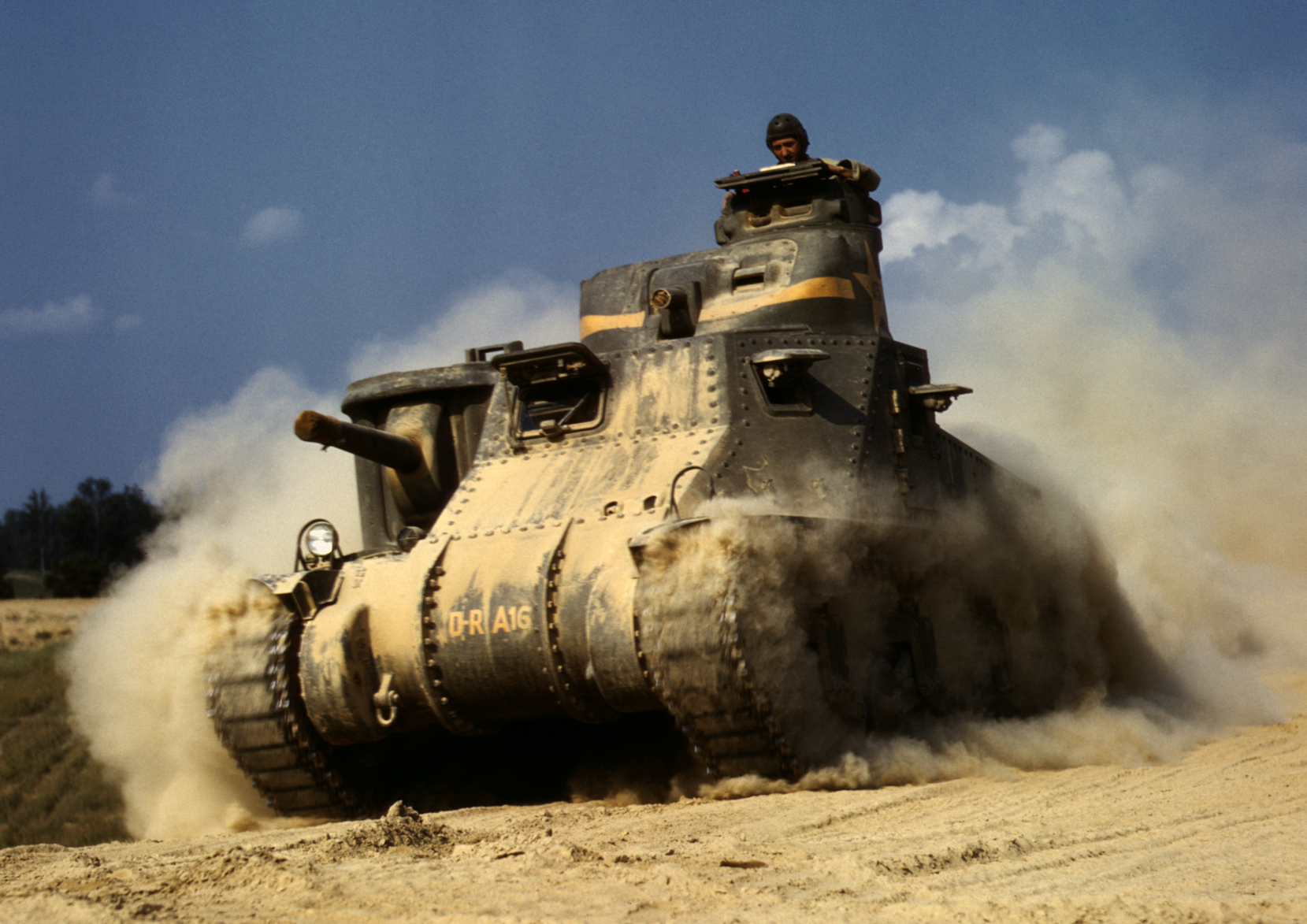
- Medium Tank, M3, Fort Knox, June 1942
- Type: Medium tank
- Place of origin: United States

Service history
- In service: 1941–1955
- Wars: World War II

Production history
- Manufacturer: Detroit Tank Arsenal; American Locomotive Company; Pullman Standard; Pressed Steel Car Company; Baldwin Locomotive Works
- Unit cost: $55,250
- Produced: August 1941 – December 1942
- No. built: 6,258
- Variants: See Variants

Specifications
- Mass: 30 short tons (27 long tons; 27 t)
- Length: 18 ft 6 in (5.64 m)
- Width: 8 ft 11 in (2.72 m)
- Height: 10 ft 3 in (3.12 m) – Lee
- Crew: Seven (Lee); Six (Grant)
- Armor: 51 mm (2.0 in) hull front, turret front, sides, and rear; 38 mm (1.5 in) (hull sides and rear)
- Main armament: 1 × 75 mm Gun M2/M3 in hull; 46 rounds; 1 × 37mm Gun M5/M6 in turret; 178 rounds
- Secondary armament: 2–3–4 × .30-06 Browning M1919A4 machine guns; 9,200 rounds
- Engine: Wright-Continental R975 EC2; 400 hp (300 kW)/340 hp (250 kW)
- Transmission: Mack Synchromesh, five speeds forward, one reverse
- Suspension: vertical volute spring
- Ground clearance: 18 in (0.46 m)
- Fuel capacity: 664 L (175 US gal)
- Operational range: 120 mi (193 km)
- Maximum speed: 26 mph (42 km/h) (road); 16 mph (26 km/h) (off-road)
- Steering system: Controlled differential

The M3 Lee, officially Medium Tank, M3, was an American medium tank used during World War II. The turret was produced in two different forms, one for US needs and one modified to British requirements to place the radio next to the commander. In British Commonwealth service, the tank was called by two names: tanks employing US-pattern turrets were called "Lee", named after Confederate general Robert E. Lee, while those with British-pattern turrets were known as "Grant", named after Union general Ulysses S. Grant.

Design commenced in July 1940, and the first M3s were operational in late 1941. The US Army needed a medium tank armed with a 75 mm gun and coupled with the United Kingdom's immediate demand for 3,650 medium tanks, the Lee began production by late 1940. The design was a compromise meant to produce a tank as soon as possible and serve only until replaced by the following M4 Sherman tank. The M3 was reliable, had considerable firepower, good armor, and high mobility but had serious drawbacks in its general design and shape, including a high silhouette, an archaic sponson mounting of the main gun preventing the tank from taking a hull-down position, and riveted construction.

It was considered by Hans von Luck (a German army officer who wrote the post-war memoir Panzer Commander), to be superior in May 1942 to the Panzer IV and able to operate out of range of German 5 cm anti-tank guns. However, by mid-1943, with the introduction of upgunned Panzer IIIs and Panzer IVs, the tank had been withdrawn from combat in most theaters and replaced by the more capable M4 Sherman tank as soon as it became available in larger numbers.

Despite its being replaced elsewhere, the British continued to use M3s in combat against the Japanese in southeast Asia until 1945. Nearly a thousand M3s were supplied to the Soviet military under Lend-Lease between 1941 and 1943.

== Development ==
The U.S. funded tank development poorly during the interwar years, and had little experience in design as well as poor doctrine to guide design efforts. Only a few tanks were built (35 between 1920-1935). A new medium tank was designed in 1938, tested as the T5 and accepted as the M2 Medium. A radial engine and vertical volute suspension were among many of the features of the M2 light tank.

In 1939, the U.S. Army possessed approximately 400 tanks, mostly M2 light tanks, with 18 of the M2 Mediums as the only ones considered "modern."

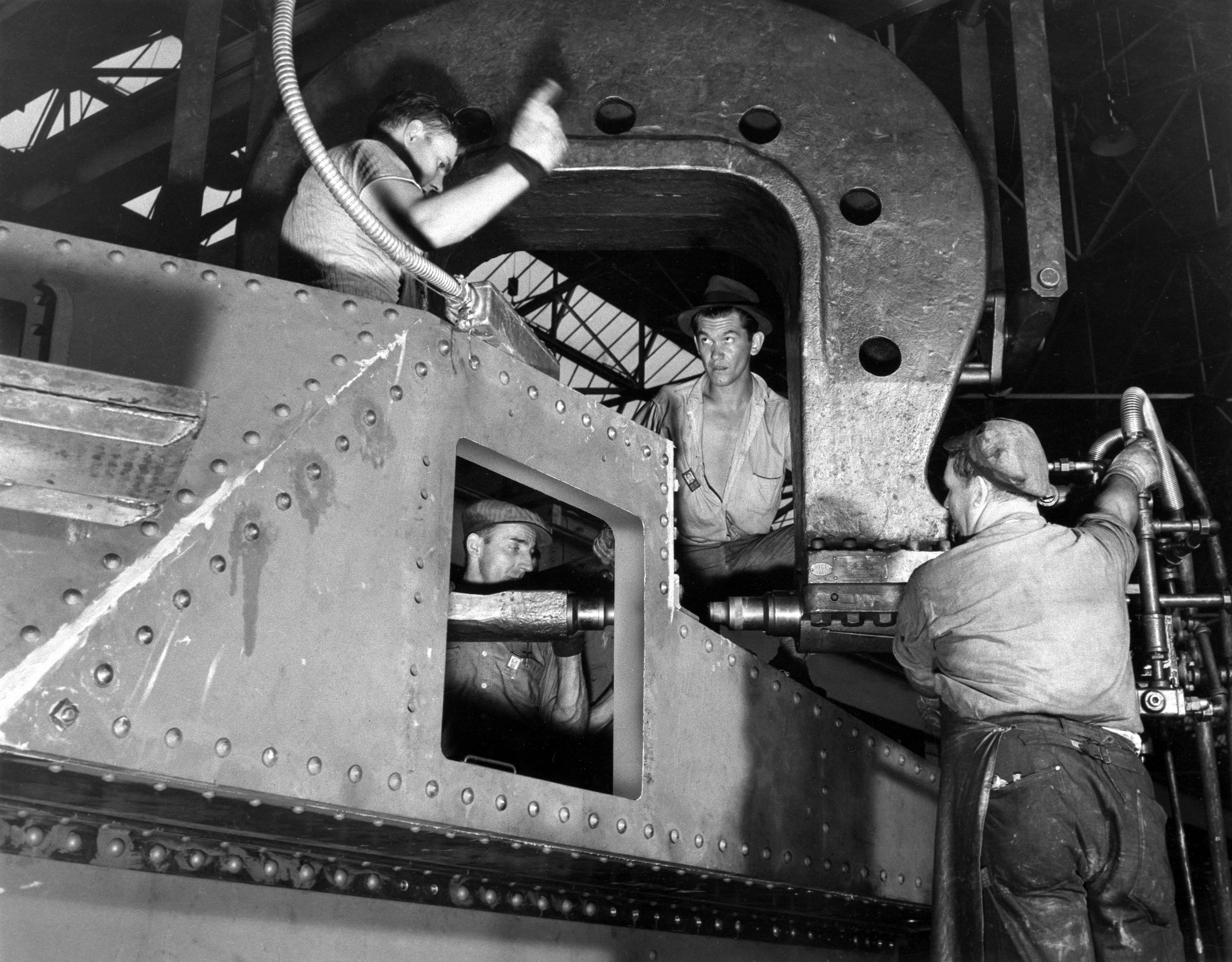
The armor plate on the M3 was too heavy for welding and had to be riveted in position.

The M2 Medium Tank was typical of armored fighting vehicles (AFVs) many nations produced in 1939. By the time the U.S. entered the war in 1941, the M2 design was already obsolete with a 37 mm gun, an impractical number of secondary machine guns, a very high silhouette, and 32 mm (1.3 in) frontal armor.

At the end June 1940 the National Munitions Program was introduced to address the United States lack of readiness in case of war across all branches of the armed forces. The program specified the building of over 1,700 medium tanks by the end of 1941. In mid July, Armored Force under Brigadier General Adna R. Chaffee Jr. was formed to take over responsibility for tanks which had previously been split between the Infantry and Cavalry commands. Work was begun with industry to create the production facilities leading to a contract in August for Chrysler to build the Detroit Tank Arsenal which was expected to turn out 10 Medium M2A1 (an improved M2 Medium) per day.

However, the US Army's assessment of the German Panzer III and Panzer IV medium tanks' success in the French campaign was that a 75mm gun was a necessity. (Note: The Panzer IV was the only German tank with a 75mm gun, which was a short barrelled weapon- the 7.5 cm KwK 37 for infantry support use.) The M2A1 could not be fitted with a 75mm weapon in its turret. Producing a new turret design would delay production and while it was decided to start work on a 75mm turret design, an interim solution was sought. An experimental modification of an improved M2 Medium into a self-propelled gun - the T5E2 - had been tested with a 75m pack howitzer in the front hull and it was decided to base the interim design on this work. The existing M2 hull could be used with a redesigned superstructure and the M2A1 37 mm turret. (Note: The 37 mm turret mounted on the M3 design replaced the rangefinder turret of the T5E2 design.) The contract for 1,000 M2A1s was cancelled and replaced with one for 1,000 M3s, though the M3 had not yet been designed. The Ordnance Department allocated 60 days for the design work. At the same time, the 75 mm gun design was started by Watervliet Arsenal; the new gun was based on the 75mm field gun.

The design was unusual because the main weapon – a larger caliber, medium-velocity 75 mm gun – was in an offset sponson mounted in the hull with limited traverse. The sponson mount was necessary because, at the time, American tank plants did not have the design experience necessary to make a gun turret capable of holding a 75 mm weapon. A small turret with a lighter, high-velocity 37 mm gun sat on top of the tall hull. A small cupola on top of the turret held a machine gun. The use of two main guns was a feature of the French Char B1 (Note: The Char B1 was designed as a self-propelled gun for use against fortifications and a turret was added to give anti-tank capability.) and the Mark I version of the British Churchill tank. (Note: The first Churchills had a howitzer to fire smoke shells in the hull) In the French tank, it had been designed as a self-propelled gun to attack fortifications and an anti-tank capability had been added through a second gun in a small turret; the Churchill carried a gun in the front hull to fire chiefly smoke shells. The M3 differed slightly from this pattern, having a dual-purpose main gun that could fire an armor-piercing projectile at a velocity high enough for effectively piercing armor, as well as deliver a high-explosive shell that was large enough to be effective. Using a hull-mounted gun, the M3 design could be produced faster than a tank with the same gun in a turret. It was understood that the M3 design was flawed, but Britain urgently needed tanks. A drawback of the sponson mount was that the M3 could not take a hull-down position and use its 75 mm gun at the same time.

The M3 was tall and roomy: the power transmission ran through the crew compartment under the turret basket to the gearbox driving the front sprockets. It was originally developed at the Rock Island Arsenal for T5 Phase III in 1938 but in 1940 Spicer Manufacturing Company was contracted to refine the design before serial production. Since Spicer itself was busy producing transmissions for the light tanks, Mack Manufacturing from 1940, and Iowa Transmission Co. (a Deere subsidiary in Waterloo) from 1941 were tasked with manufacturing it. Steering was by differential braking, with a turning circle of 37 ft (11 m). After some experiments with hydraulically powered steering on the earliest M3s mechanical long-lever operation was adopted for production.

The vertical volute spring suspension (VVSS) units possessed a return roller mounted directly atop the main housing of each of the six suspension units (three per side), designed as self-contained and readily replaced modular units bolted to the hull sides. The turret was power-traversed by an electro-hydraulic system in the form of an electric motor providing the pressure for the hydraulic motor. This fully rotated the turret in 15 seconds. Control was from a spade grip on the gun. The same motor provided pressure for the gun stabilizing system.

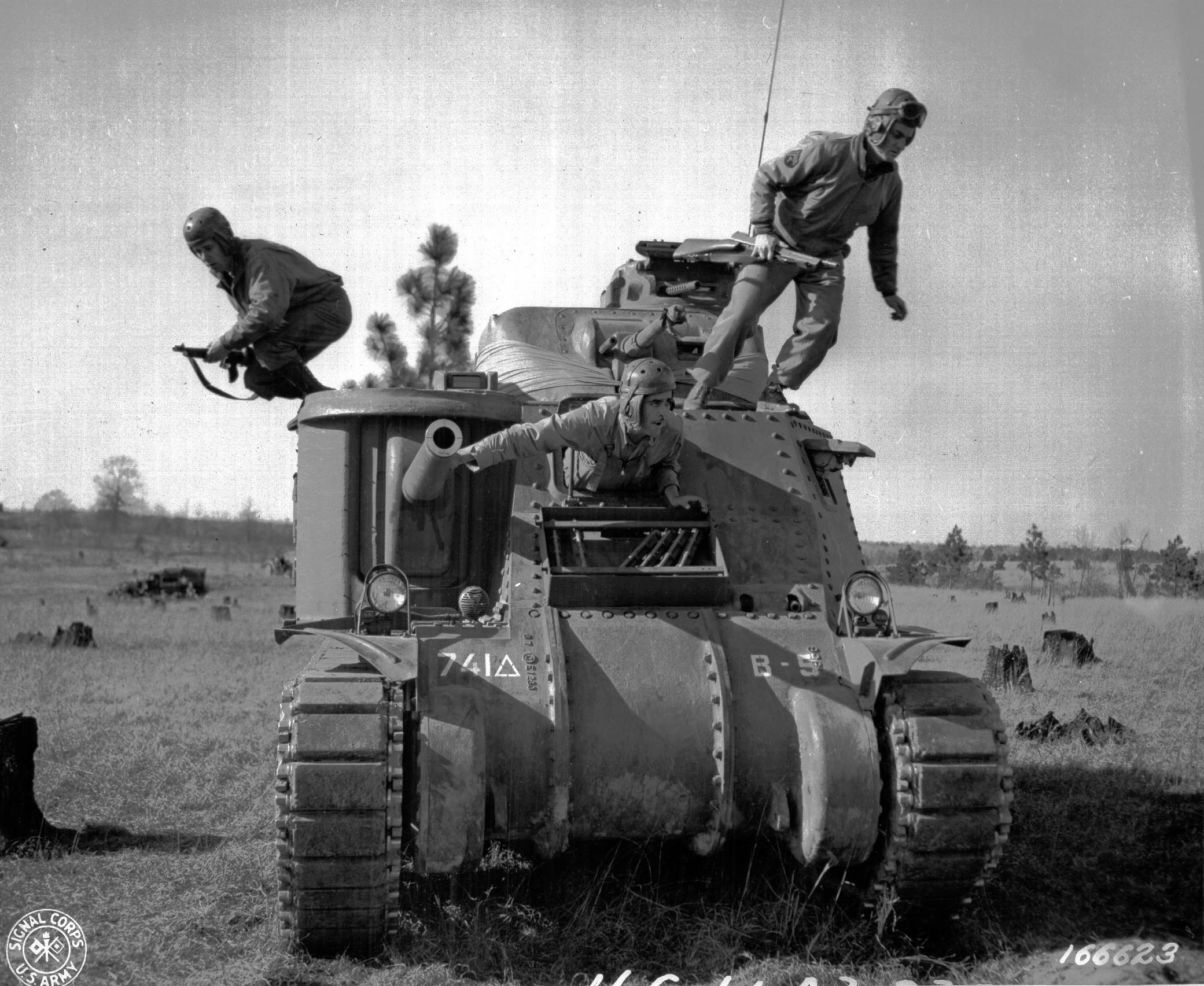
Crew exiting a "disabled" M3 tank during training maneuvers held at Camp Polk in February 1943

The 75 mm gun was operated by a gunner and a loader; sighting the gun used an M1 periscope – with an integral telescope – on the top of the sponson. The periscope rotated with the gun. The sight was marked from zero to 3,000 yd (2,700 m), (Note: Later 3,500 yards.) with vertical markings to aid deflection shooting at a moving target. The gunner laid the gun on target through geared handwheels for traverse (15° to left and to right) and elevation ( +20° to -9°). The shorter barreled 75 mm M2 cannon sometimes had a counterweight added at the end of the barrel to balance the gun for operation with the gyrostabilizer until the longer 75 mm M3 variant was brought into use.

The 37 mm gun was aimed through the M2 periscope, mounted in the mantlet to the side of the gun. It also sighted the coaxial machine gun. Two range scales were provided: 0–1,500 yd (1,400 m) for the 37 mm and 0–1,000 yd (910 m) for the machine gun.

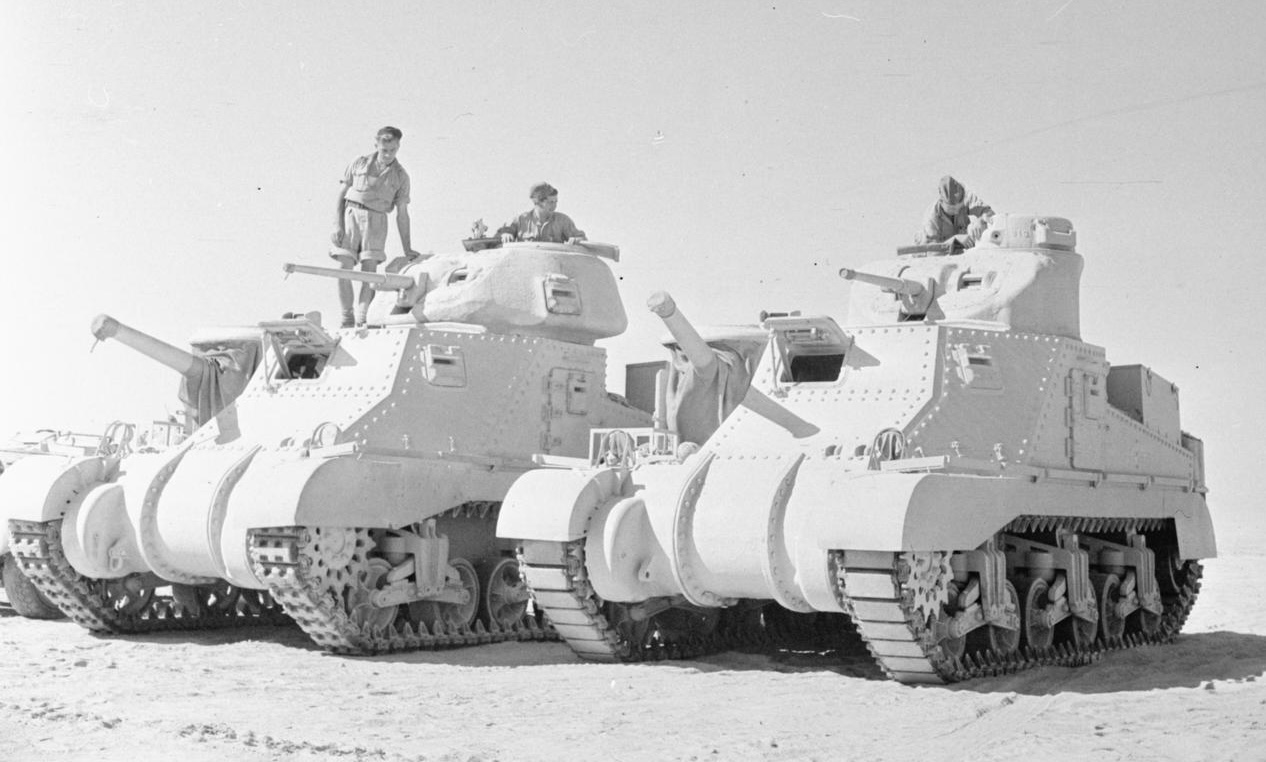
British Grant (left) and Lee (right) at El Alamein (in the Egyptian Western Desert) 1942, showing differences between the British turret and the original design of the M3

There were also two .30-06 (7.62 mm caliber) Browning M1919A4 machine guns mounted in the hull, fixed in traverse but adjustable in elevation, which were controlled by the driver. These were, due to coordination issues, removed, though they would be seen on early Sherman tanks. (Note: Two of the seven machine guns on the M2 Medium had also been in the forward hull under the driver's control.)

Though not at war, the U.S. was willing to produce, sell and ship munitions including armored vehicles to Britain. The British had requested that their Matilda II infantry tank and Crusader cruiser tank designs be made by American factories, but this request was refused. With much of their equipment left in France after the British Army was evacuated from Dunkirk, the equipment needs of the British were acute. Though not entirely satisfied with the design, they ordered the M3 in large numbers. British experts had viewed the mock-up in 1940 and identified features that they considered flaws – the high profile, the hull mounted main gun, the radio position in the hull rather than in the turret, the riveted armor plating (whose rivets tended to pop off inside the interior in a deadly ricochet when the tank was hit even by non-penetrating rounds), the smooth track design, insufficient armor and lack of splash-proofing of the joints.

The British desired modifications for the tank they were purchasing. A bustle rack was to be made at the back of the turret to house the Wireless Set No. 19. The turret was to be given thicker armor than in the original U.S. design, and the machine gun cupola was to be replaced with a simple hatch. Extended space within the turret (Note: Designed by L.E. Carr of the British Department of Mechanization and tested on a M2A1 Medium.) of the new M3 also allowed the use of a smoke bomb launcher, (Note: The "2-inch Mortar Mk III (smoke)".) although the addition of the radio would take the space for storage of fifty 37 mm rounds, reducing the ammunition capacity for that gun to 128 rounds. Several of these new "Grant" tanks would also be equipped with sand shields for action in North Africa, though they often fell off. With these modifications accepted, the British ordered 2,000 Grants, with 1,685 ultimately built.

Contracts were arranged with four US companies for 500 tanks each: Baldwin Locomotive Company, Pullman Standard Car Company, Pressed Steel Car Company and Lima Locomotive Company. The total cost of the orders was approximately US$240 million ($120,000 per piece), including funds for factory re-tooling. That was the total of all UK government funds held in the US; it took the US Lend-Lease act to solve the financial shortfall and fund future equipment orders (for comparison, Lend-Lease cost of a M3 was $64,814). The order with Baldwin was later increased from 500 to 685. Lima did not produce a single Grant against its contract as it took the company so long to complete the steam locomotives already in production to create factory space and to tool-up that M3 production was winding down before it was ready. It was therefore agreed that Lima would supply 500 of the new M4 Sherman instead. Lima actually undertook the T6/M4 development while it was unable to manufacture the Grant and, as the other companies were all too busy, was the first company to begin producing the M4 in March 1942 with the M4A1 variant. The first 28 M4A1s built were British contract tanks as Grant replacements but the remainder of the order was subsumed into Lend-Lease.

The prototype M3 was completed in March 1941 and production models followed, with the first British-specification tanks produced in July. Both U.S. and British tanks had thicker armor than first planned. The British design required one fewer crew member than the US version due to the radio in the turret. The U.S. eventually eliminated the full-time radio operator, assigning the task to the driver. After extensive losses in Africa and Greece, the British realized that to meet their needs for tanks, they would have to take both the Lee and the Grant types.

The U.S. military used the "M" (Model) letter to designate nearly all of its equipment. When the British Army received its new M3 medium tanks from the US, confusion immediately set in between the different M3 medium tank and M3 light tank. The British Army was in the process of using names for its own tanks instead of designations and named its American tanks after American military figures, although the U.S. Army never used those terms until after the war. M3 tanks with the cast turret and radio setup received the name "General Grant", while the original M3s were called "General Lee", or more usually just "Grant" and "Lee".

The chassis and running gear of the M3 design was adapted by the Canadians for their Ram tank. The hull of the M3 was also used for self-propelled artillery as with the original design of the M7 Priest, of which nearly 3,500 were built, and recovery vehicles.

== Production ==
In addition to the Detroit arsenal, American Locomotive and Baldwin Locomotive were brought into the production scheme in October 1940 Neither company needed to also build a factory and so their first tanks were complete - a bit before Detroit's - in April 1941. Even then the shortage of components meant that after American Locomotive's ceremonial driving of its first tank before senior officials, the transmission was removed and sent to Baldwin so that they could carry out a similar ceremony a few days later. The British placed contracts for the Grant with Baldwin, Lima Locomotive and Pullman-Standard in October 1940

Canada did place an order with Montreal Locomotive Works, a subsidiary of American Locomotive, for the production of over 1000 M3s. but in January this turned into design and production of the Ram tank which was based on the M3 lower hull and suspension.

Production by model and manufacturer
Model	M3	M3A1	M3A2	M3A3	M3A4	M3A5	Grant I	Grant II	Total
American Locomotive Company	285	300							585
Baldwin Locomotive Works	84		2	239		210	221	464	1,220
Detroit Tank Arsenal	3,243				109				3,352
Pressed Steel Car Company							501		501
Pullman-Standard Car Company							500		500

== Operational history ==
Of the 6,258 M3 variants manufactured, 2,887 (45%) were supplied to the British government for use by British and Commonwealth forces. 1,685 of these were Grants which the UK ordered directly from US industry under cash and carry and which did not fall under the Lend-Lease arrangements.

The M3 Grant first saw action with units of the Royal Armoured Corps in North Africa during the Gazala battles of May 1942. However, with the arrival of the M4 Sherman tank from October 1942 the surviving M3s in North Africa became surplus and were mostly shipped on to India. 657 Grants and 75 Lees were supplied directly to North Africa.

Ninety-seven Grants and 119 M3 Lees - including 49 diesel M3A3 Lee Vs, the only diesel Lees used by UK and Commonwealth forces - were supplied directly to the UK and were used for testing and training. 335 were later converted to Canal Defense Lights (no diesels), and further refurbished turretless M3 hulls were supplied by the US to support this project.

777 were supplied directly to the Australian Army for home defense and training duties in Australia. None was used operationally. These comprised 255 Lee Is, 266 Grant Is and 232 Grant IIs. The British Indian Army received 896 M3 series tanks as new supply and tanks shipped from North Africa. These comprised 517 Lee Is and 379 Grant Is.

A further 1,386 were exported to the Soviet Union, although only 957 of these reached Russian ports due to German U-boat and air attacks on Allied convoys.

=== North African campaign ===
The M3 brought much-needed firepower to British forces in the campaign in the North African desert. Early Grants were shipped directly to Egypt and lacked some fitments (such as radio) that were remedied locally. Under the "Mechanisation Experimental Establishment (Middle East)" other modifications were tested approved and made to tanks as they were issued. These included fitting of sand shields (later deliveries from the US had factory fitted shields), dust covers for the gun mantlets and the removal of the hull machine guns. Ammunition stowage was altered to 80 x 75 mm (up from 50) and 80 x 37 mm with additional protection to the ammunition bins.

Grants arrived in North Africa by the end of January 1942, and British crews began training on them. As it was developed from the World War I-era French 75 mm gun, the British had ammunition stocks left over from then that could be used for the 75 mm M2 gun but these suffered due to age. The armor-piercing shell for the 75 mm was a solid shot and could penetrate around 2 inches (50 mm) of armor at 1,000 m, which was better than the 2-pounder guns of British tanks, but better performance was desired. Fortunately, large numbers of German 75 mm shells were captured, and these were matched to the American cartridge. This conversion gave improved performance and was followed by an improved American AP shell design (the M61). While the Grants had been expected to be a temporary until the Crusader Mark III tank with a 57 mm 6-pounder gun was available, problems with the Crusader led to changes. The Grant became the main tank in use, and cruiser tanks such as the Crusader Mk I and II replaced the M3 light tank in British units.

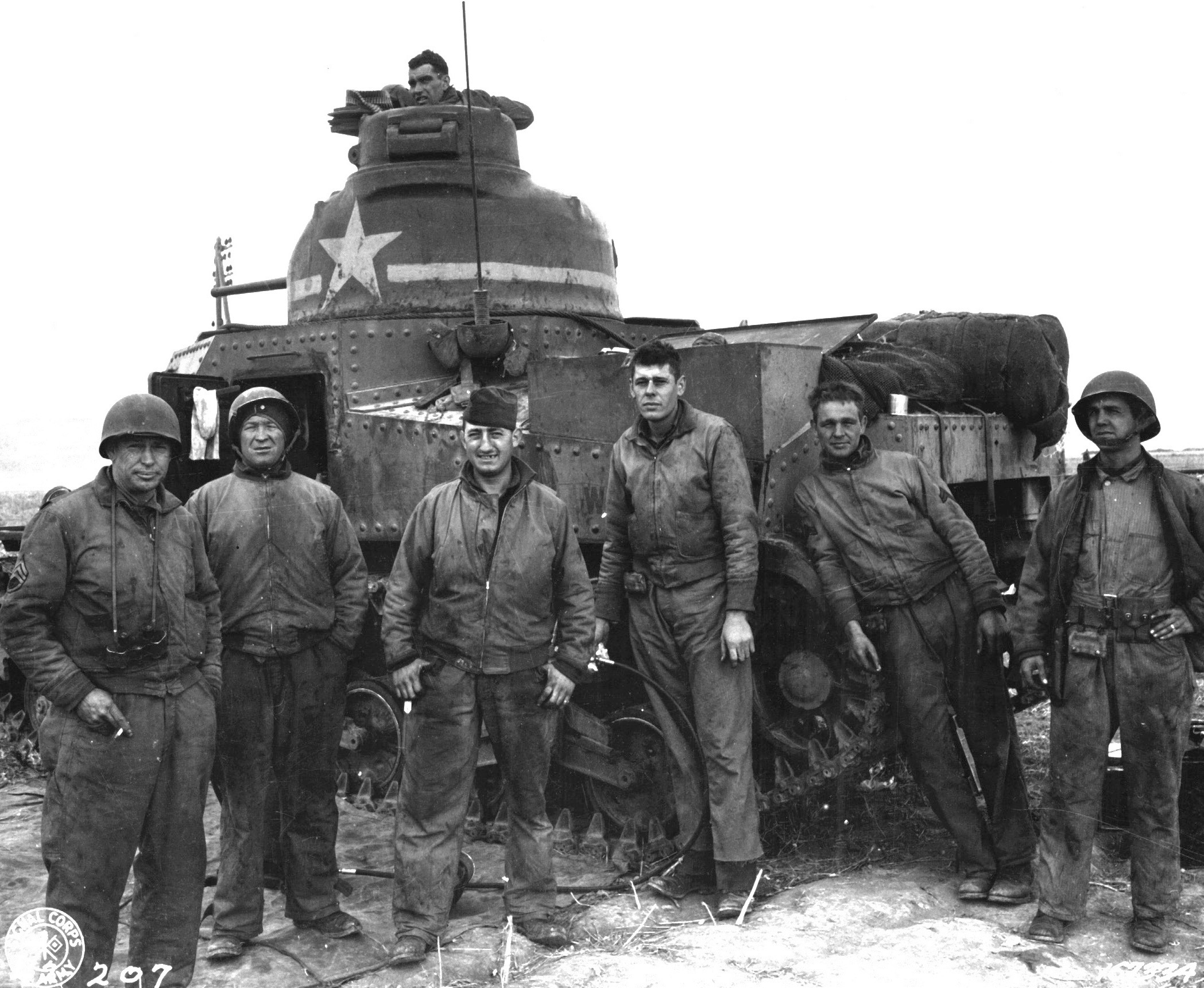
Crew of M3 tank at Souk el Arba, Tunisia, November 23, 1942.

The M3 tank's first action during the war was in 1942 during the North African Campaign. British Lees and Grants were in action against Rommel's forces at the Battle of Gazala on 27 May. In the preparations for the battle the Eighth Army received 167 M3 tanks. The 8th King's Royal Irish Hussars, 3rd and 5th battalions Royal Tank Regiment went into action with Grant tanks. Retreating in the face of a large attack, the 8th Hussars had only three Grants remaining, while 3rd RTR reported losing 16.

Their appearance was a surprise to the Germans, who were unprepared for the M3's 75 mm gun. They soon discovered the M3 could engage them beyond the effective range of their 5 cm Pak 38 anti-tank gun, and the 5 cm KwK 39 of the Panzer III, their main medium tank. The M3 was also vastly superior to the Fiat M13/40 and M14/41 tanks employed by the Italian troops, whose 47 mm gun was effective only at point-blank range, while only the few Semoventi da 75/18 self-propelled guns were able to destroy it using HEAT rounds. In addition to the M3's superior range, they were equipped with high explosive shells for infantry and other soft targets, which previous British tanks had lacked; upon the introduction of the M3, Rommel noted: "Up to May of 1942, our tanks had in general been superior in quality to the corresponding British types. This was now no longer true, at least not to the same extent."

Despite the M3's advantages and surprise appearance during the Battle of Gazala, it could not win the battle for the British. In particular, the high-velocity 88 mm anti-aircraft gun, in use as its secondary role of an anti-tank gun, proved deadly if British tanks attacked without artillery support. Britain's Director of Armoured Fighting Vehicles nonetheless said before the M4 Sherman arrived that "The Grants and the Lees have proven to be the mainstay of the fighting forces in the Middle East; their great reliability, powerful armament and sound armor have endeared them to the troops."

By the Second Battle of El Alamein in late 1942, there were 600 M3s, of both types, in British service. Some of these were used for training in the UK.

Grants and Lees served with British units in North Africa until the end of the campaign. Following Operation Torch (the invasion of French North Africa), the US also fought in North Africa using the M3 Lee.

The US 1st Armored Division had been issued the new M4 Sherman, but had given up one regiment's worth to the British Army so that it could use them in the Second Battle of El Alamein (October–November 1942). Consequently, a regiment of the division was still using the M3 Lee when it arrived in North Africa.

The M3 was generally appreciated during the North African campaign for its mechanical reliability, good armor protection, and heavy firepower. (Note: Initially there were problems with engine wear and suspension springs.)

However, the high silhouette and low, hull-mounted 75 mm were tactical drawbacks since they prevented fighting from a hull-down firing position. In addition, the use of riveted hull superstructure armor on the early versions led to spalling, where the impact of enemy shells caused the rivets to break off and become projectiles inside the tank. Later models were built with all-welded armor to eliminate this problem. These lessons had already been applied to the design and production of the M4.

The M3 was replaced in front-line roles by the Sherman as soon as it became available. However, several specialist vehicles based on the M3 were later employed in Europe, such as the M31 armored recovery vehicle and the Canal Defence Light.

In early 1943, the British Eight Army's M3s, now replaced by the Sherman, were shipped to the Pacific theatre to replace some Matildas in the Australian Army.

=== Eastern Europe—Soviet service ===
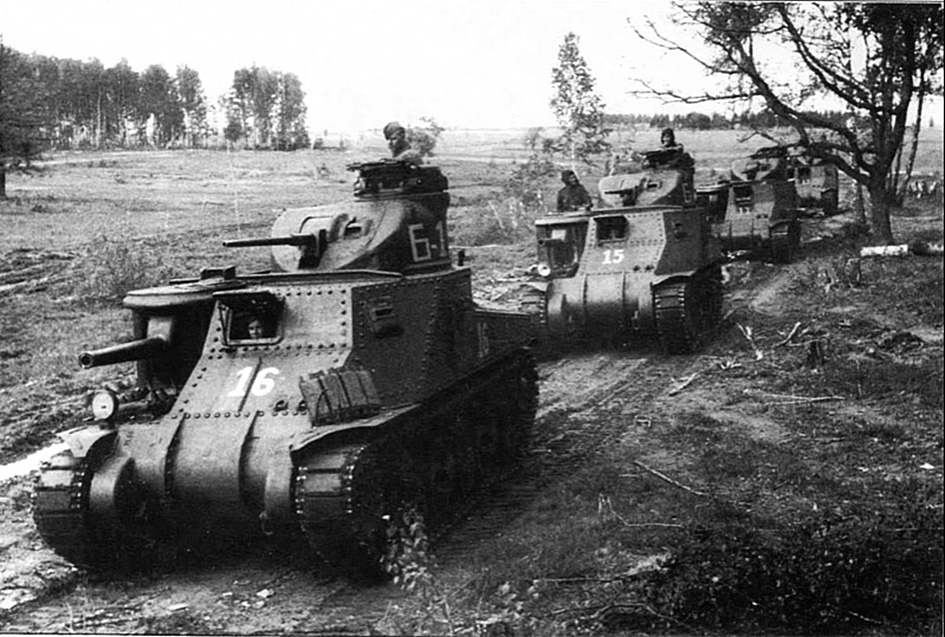
A company of M3 Lee tanks of the Soviet 6th Guards Army advance towards the front line during the Battle of Kursk, July 1943

Beginning from 1941, 1,386 M3 medium tanks were shipped from the US to the Soviet Union, with 417 lost when their transporting vessels were sunk by German submarine, naval and aerial attacks en route. These were supplied through the American Lend-Lease program between 1942 and 1943.

Soviet Red Army personnel tended to refer to the M3 as the "Grant", even though all of the M3s shipped to Russia were "Lee" variants. The official Soviet designation for it was the М3 средний (М3с), or "M3 Medium", to distinguish the Lee from the US-built M3 Stuart light tank, which was also acquired by the USSR under Lend-Lease and was officially known there as the М3 лёгкий (М3л), or "M3 Light".

Due to the vehicle's petrol-fueled engine, a high tendency to catch fire, and its vulnerability against most types of German armor the Soviet troops encountered from 1942 onwards, the tank was almost universally unpopular with the Red Army since its introduction in the Eastern Front. In the letter sent to Franklin Roosevelt (18 July 1942), Stalin wrote: "I consider it my duty to warn you that, according to our experts at the front, U.S. tanks catch fire very easily when hit from behind or from the side by anti-tank rifle bullets. The reason is that the high-grade gasoline used forms inside the tank a thick layer of highly inflammable fumes." With almost 1,500 Russian T-34 tanks being built every month, Soviet use of the M3 medium tank declined soon after mid-1943. Soviet troops still fielded their Lee/Grant tanks on secondary and less active fronts, such as in the Arctic region during the Red Army's Petsamo–Kirkenes Offensive against German forces in Norway in October 1944, where the obsolete US tanks faced mainly captured French tanks used by the Germans, such as the SOMUA S35, which to a limited extent was somewhat comparable to the Lee/Grant it fought against.

=== Pacific War ===
In the Pacific War, armor played a relatively minor role for the Allies as well as for the Japanese, compared with that of naval, air, and infantry units.

In the Pacific Ocean Theater and the Southwest Pacific Theater, the US Army deployed none of its dedicated armored divisions and only a third of its 70 separate tank battalions.

A small number of M3 Lees saw action in the central Pacific Ocean Theater in 1943. The US Marine Corps, bypassed the M3 Lees, switching from M3 Stuarts directly to M4 Shermans in mid-1944.

Some M3 Grants played an offensive role with the British Indian Army, in the south-east Asian theater.

The Australian Army also used Grants during World War II, mainly for homeland defense and training purposes.

=== Pacific Ocean Theater ===
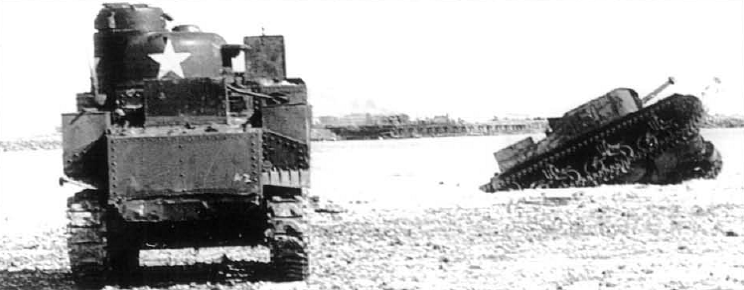
US Army M3A5 Lees during the Battle of Makin

The only combat use of the M3 Lee by the US Army against Japanese forces occurred during the Gilbert and Marshall Islands campaign of 1943.

Following the better-known landing at Tarawa, the US 27th Infantry Division made an amphibious assault on Makin Island with armored support from a platoon of M3A5 Lees equipped with deep-wading kits belonging to the US Army's 193rd Tank Battalion.

=== Burma ===
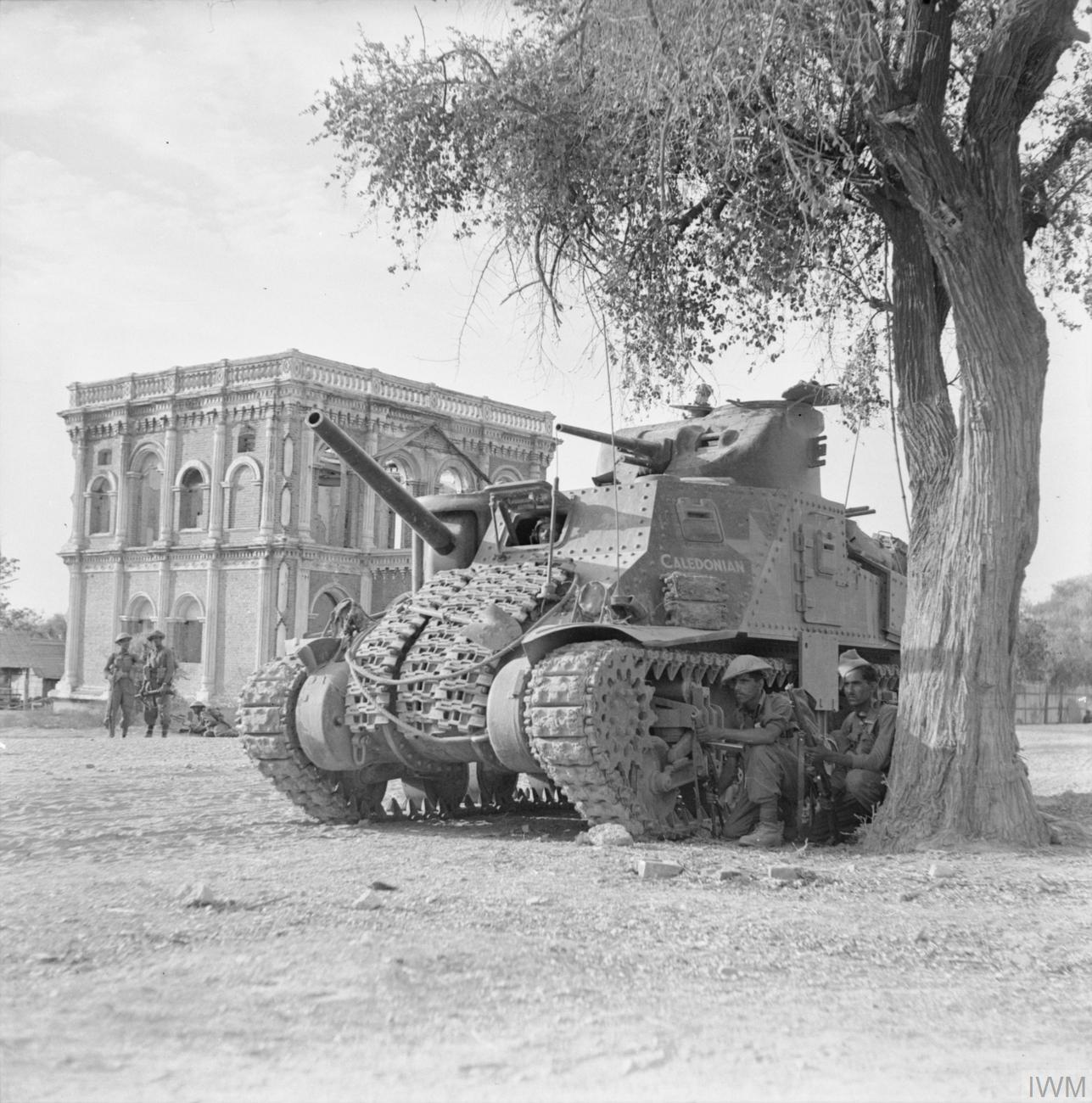
A British M3 Lee in Mandalay, Burma (Myanmar), during the Burma Campaign in March 1945. Spare tracks are welded onto the front glacis for extra protection.

After British Commonwealth forces in Europe and the Mediterranean began receiving M4 Shermans, about 900 British-ordered M3 Lees/Grants were shipped to the Indian Army. Some of these saw action against Japanese troops and tanks in the Burma Campaign.

They were used by the British Fourteenth Army until the fall of Rangoon, regarded as performing "admirably" in their original intended role of supporting infantry in Burma between 1944 and 1945. It played a pivotal role during the Battle of Imphal, during which the Imperial Japanese Army's 14th Tank Regiment (primarily equipped with their own Type 95 Ha-Go light tanks, together with a handful of captured British M3 Stuart light tanks) encountered M3 medium tanks for the first time and found their light tanks outgunned and outmatched. The British M3 tanks performed well as they traversed the steep hillsides around Imphal and defeated the assaulting Japanese forces. Officially declared obsolete in April 1944, nevertheless, the Lee/Grant saw action until the end of the war in September 1945.

=== Australia ===
At the beginning of the war, Australian Army doctrine viewed tank units as minor offensive components within infantry divisions. It had no dedicated armored branch and most of its very limited capabilities in tank warfare had been deployed to the North African Campaign (i.e. three divisional cavalry battalions). By early 1941, the effectiveness of large-scale German panzer attacks had been recognized, and a dedicated armored mustering was formed. The Australian Armoured Corps initially included the cadres of three armored divisions – all of which were equipped at least partly with M3 Grants made available from surplus British orders.

The 1st Australian Armoured Division was formed with a view towards complementing the three Australian infantry divisions then in North Africa. However, following the outbreak of hostilities with Japan, the division was retained in Australia. During April–May 1942, the 1st Armoured Division's regiments were reported to be re-equipping with M3 Grants and were training, in a series of large exercises, in the area around Narrabri.

The cadres of the 2nd and 3rd Armoured Divisions were both officially formed in 1942, as Militia (reserve/home defense) units. These divisions were also partly equipped with M3 Grants.

In January 1943, the main body of the 1st Armoured Division was deployed to home defense duties between Perth and Geraldton, where it formed part of III Corps.

By the middle of the war, the Australian Army had deemed the Grant to be unsuitable for combat duties overseas, and M3 units were re-equipped with the Matilda II before being deployed to the New Guinea and Borneo Campaigns. Due to personnel shortages, all three divisions were officially disbanded during 1943 and downgraded to brigade- and battalion-level units.

==== Post-war use in Australia ====
During the war, the Australian Army had converted some M3 Grants for special purposes, including a small number of bulldozer variants, beach armoured recovery vehicles, and wader prototypes.

Following the end of the war, 14 of the Australian M3A5 Grants were converted to a local self-propelled gun design, the Yeramba. Until the future acquisition of the AS9 Huntsman is complete, the Yeramba remains as the only SPG ever deployed by the Australian Army. Fitted with a 25-pounder field gun, the Yerambas remained in service with the 22nd Field Regiment, Royal Australian Artillery, until the late 1950s.

Many M3s deemed surplus to Australian Army requirements were acquired by civilian buyers during the 1950s and 1960s for conversion to earthmoving equipment and tractors.

=== Conclusion ===
Overall, the M3 was able to be effective on the battlefield from 1942 until 1943. However, US armored units lacked the tactical expertise to overcome its design. Its armor and firepower were equal or superior to most of the threats it faced, especially in the Pacific. Long-range, high-velocity guns were not yet common on German tanks in the African theater. However, the rapid pace of tank development meant that the M3 was very quickly outclassed.

== Variants ==
M3 and its contribution to other AFVs of the Second World War.

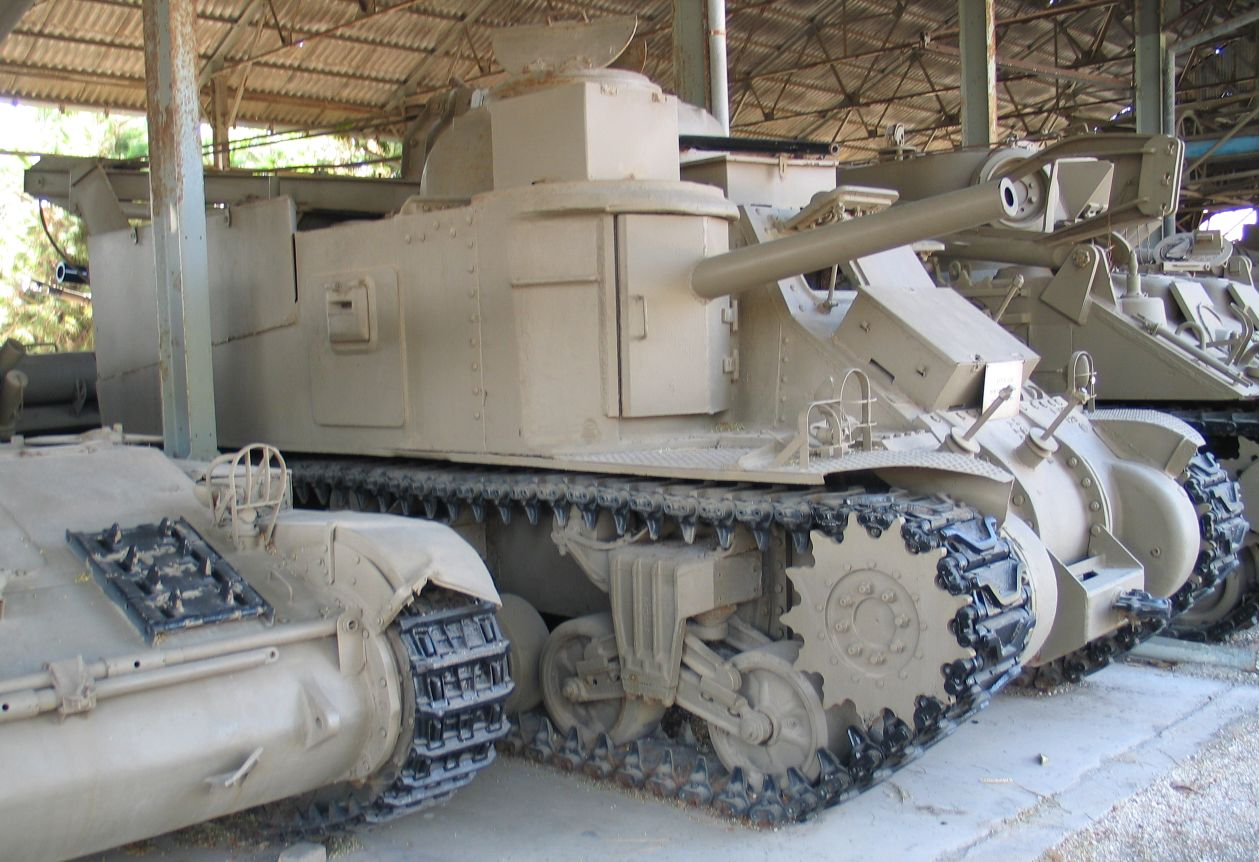
M31B1 TRV showing dummy hull gun.

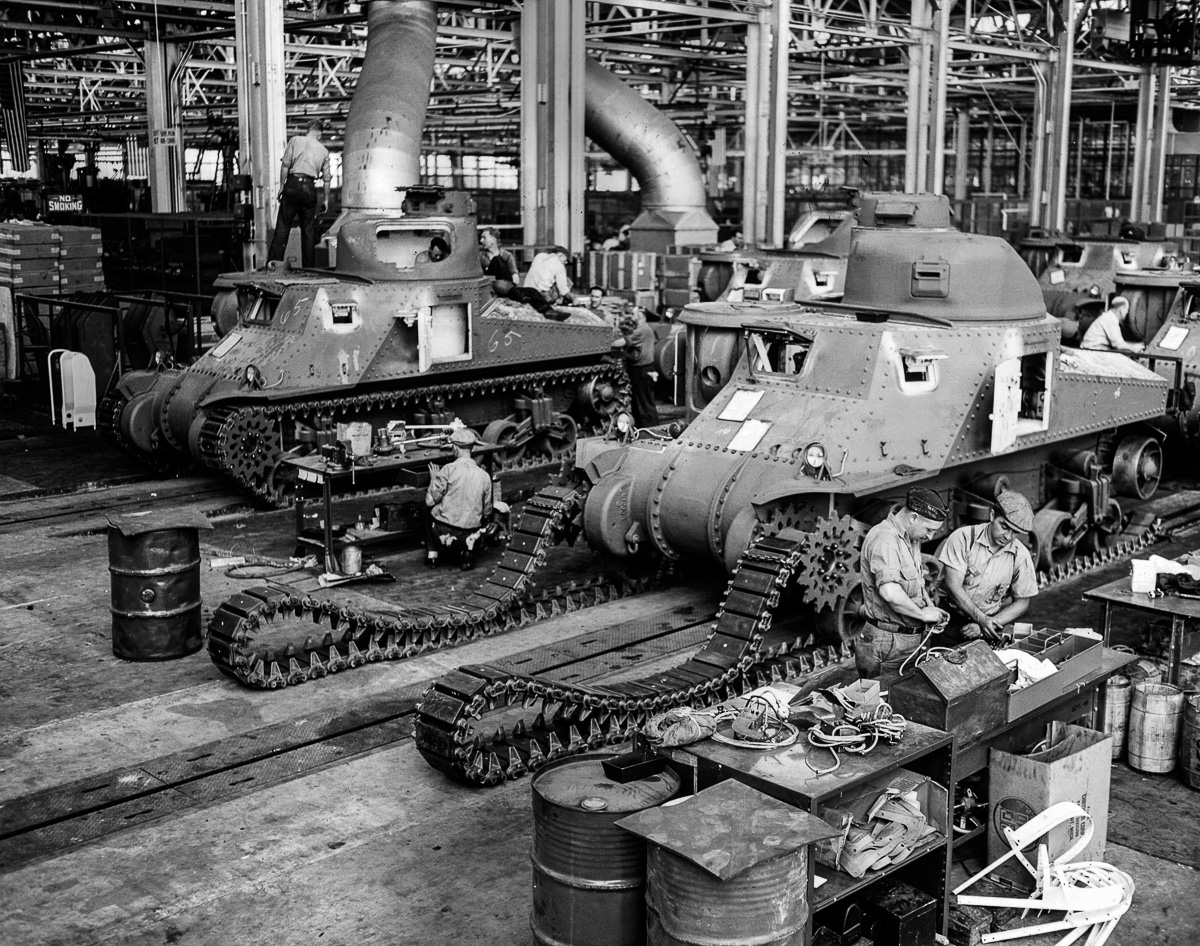
M3 Lees on the production line at Chrysler's Detroit Arsenal

=== US variants ===
American designations first with British Commonwealth designations (where actually used) given in parentheses.

M3 (Lee I)
Original baseline design. Riveted hull. Continental radial gasoline engine. 4,724 built.
M3A1
Cast (rounded) upper hull variant. 300 built. 28 were experimentally converted with the Guiberson T-1400-2 350 hp radial diesel engine, which proved unsatisfactory. Never used operationally.
M3A2
Welded hull version of baseline M3. Only 12 produced, 10 of which were completed as Grant I. At least 1 of these was supplied to Australia and another was converted to a Grant Scorpion.
M3A3 (Lee V)
Diesel-engined variant with welded hull. Twin GM 6-71 diesel engines coupled together to make the GM6046 powerpack. Side doors welded shut or later eliminated. 288 built, 49 supplied to the UK and 77 supplied to Brazil. 83 M3A3 hulls completed as Grant II.
M3A4
Stretched riveted hull to accommodate the Chrysler A57 multibank engine, made up of five 4.12 liter displacement, 6-cylinder L-head car engines (block upwards) mated to a common crankshaft. Displacement 21 liters, 470 hp (350 kW; 480 PS) at 2,700 rpm. Side doors eliminated. 109 built. Only used for training in the US.
M3A5
Rivetted hull but otherwise as per the M3A3. 591 built, 387 as Grant IIs. Only used operationally once by US forces. 23 supplied to Brazil.
M31 Tank Recovery Vehicle (Grant ARV I)
Based on M3 chassis, with dummy turret and guns. A 60,000 lb (27,000 kg) winch installed.
M31B1 Tank Recovery Vehicle
Based on M3A3.
M31B2 Tank Recovery Vehicle
Based on M3A5.
There were 296 total M31B1/B2 vehicles, although the precise quantity of both variants is unknown (it appears that M31B1 was more common). 146 of them were converted from used tanks and 150 from newly built tanks before their acceptance.
M33 Prime Mover
M31 TRV converted to the artillery tractor role, with turret and crane removed. 109 vehicles were converted in 1943-44.
105 mm Howitzer Motor Carriage M7 (Priest)
105 mm M1/M2 howitzer installed in open superstructure. A gunless version was used as an observation post (OP) vehicle
155 mm Gun Motor Carriage M12
Designed as the T6. A 155 mm howitzer on M3 chassis. 100 built in 1942-1943. M30 Cargo Carrier on same chassis to transport gun crew and ammunition.

=== British Commonwealth service names and variants ===
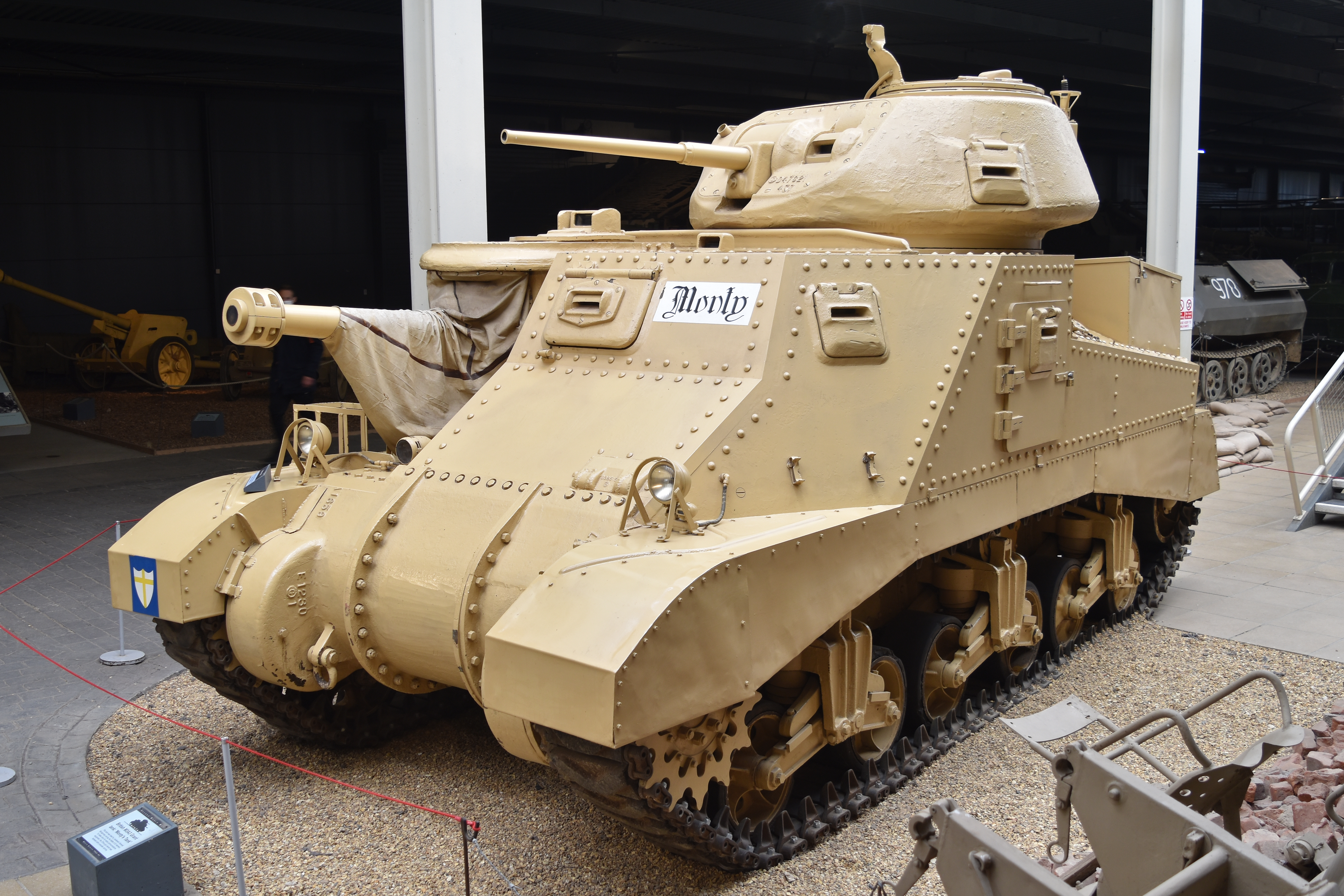
The Grant command tank used in North Africa by Lieutenant-General Montgomery, preserved in the Imperial War Museum Duxford

Grant tank on a Scammell Pioneer transporter, January 1943

British designation	US designation	Engine	Hull construction	Armament & Hull Construction
Lee I	M3	340 hp Wright-Continental	US style cast turret, riveted hull	37mm, 75mm, 2 × .30 cal. Browning MGs
Lee II	M3A1	340 hp Wright-Continental	Cast upper hull, Riveted or welded lower hull	37mm, 75mm, 2 × .30 cal. Browning MGs
Lee III	M3A2	340 hp Wright-Continental	Welded hull	37mm, 75mm, 2 × .30 cal. Browning MGs
Lee IV	M3A1	345 hp Guiberson (Diesel)	Cast upper hull, riveted or welded lower hull	37mm, 75mm, 2 × .30 cal. Browning MGs
Lee V	M3A3	375 hp GM 6-71 (Dual Diesel)	welded hull	37mm, 75mm, 2 × .30 cal. Browning MGs
Lee VI	M3A4	425 hp Chrysler	riveted hull	37mm, 75mm, 2 × .30 cal. Browning MGs
Grant I	M3 M3A2	340 hp Wright-Continental	British style cast turret, riveted hull British style cast turret,, welded hull	37mm, 75mm, 2 × .30 cal. Browning MGs 2-inch Bomb Thrower No. 1 Mk I
Grant II	M3A3 M3A5	375 hp GM 6-71	British style cast turret, welded hull British style cast turret, riveted hull	37mm, 75mm, 2 × .30 cal. Browning MGs 2-inch Bomb Thrower No. 1 Mk I

- Grant I
  - M3 and M3A2 with turret to British specification and internal differences, no cupola. 1,211 M3-based and 10 M3A2-based Grant Is supplied.
- Grant II
  - Final Baldwin production based on M3A3 and M3A5 after US Ordnance ordered them to switch from petrol to diesel production. 381 Grant IIs based on M3A5s were supplied along with 83 based on M3A3s.
- Grant ARV
  - Conversions of Grant I or II in 1943. Turret and hull guns removed and replaced with armored recovery vehicle equipment including towing winch and jib. A few were fitted with a dummy turret while others had just a hatch with a twin Bren light machine gun mount fitted for AA defense. The superior M31 was adopted instead in small numbers.
- Grant ARV I
  - US T2 (later M31) in British service 1944-1945.
- Grant Command
  - Fitted with map table and extra radio equipment. On some, the 37mm guns were removed or replaced with dummies.
- Grant Scorpion III
  - 75 mm (3.0 in) gun removed to allow for fitment with Scorpion III mine flail - as used on other British tanks - by REME workshops, few made in January 1943 for use in Tunisia campaign in North Africa.
- Grant Scorpion IV
  - Scorpion III with second Bedford motor at left rear to increase power to the flail rotor.
- Grant CDL
  - "Canal Defence Light"; 37mm turret replaced by one with a powerful carbon arc light which could be set to flicker rapidly to disorient the enemy. A BESA (UK) or Browning M1919 (US) machine gun was fitted and some were fitted with a dummy 37mm gun. The Grant CDL replaced the earlier Matilda II CDL in anticipation of use in Northwest Europe. 335 were converted in the UK, some on refurbished M3 Lee hulls specially supplied by the US. The US produced 497 of their own version to equip six tank battalions under the designation Shop Tractor T10 to disguise its purpose. Converted by American Loco in 1943 from M3A1 cast hull.

=== Australian variants ===
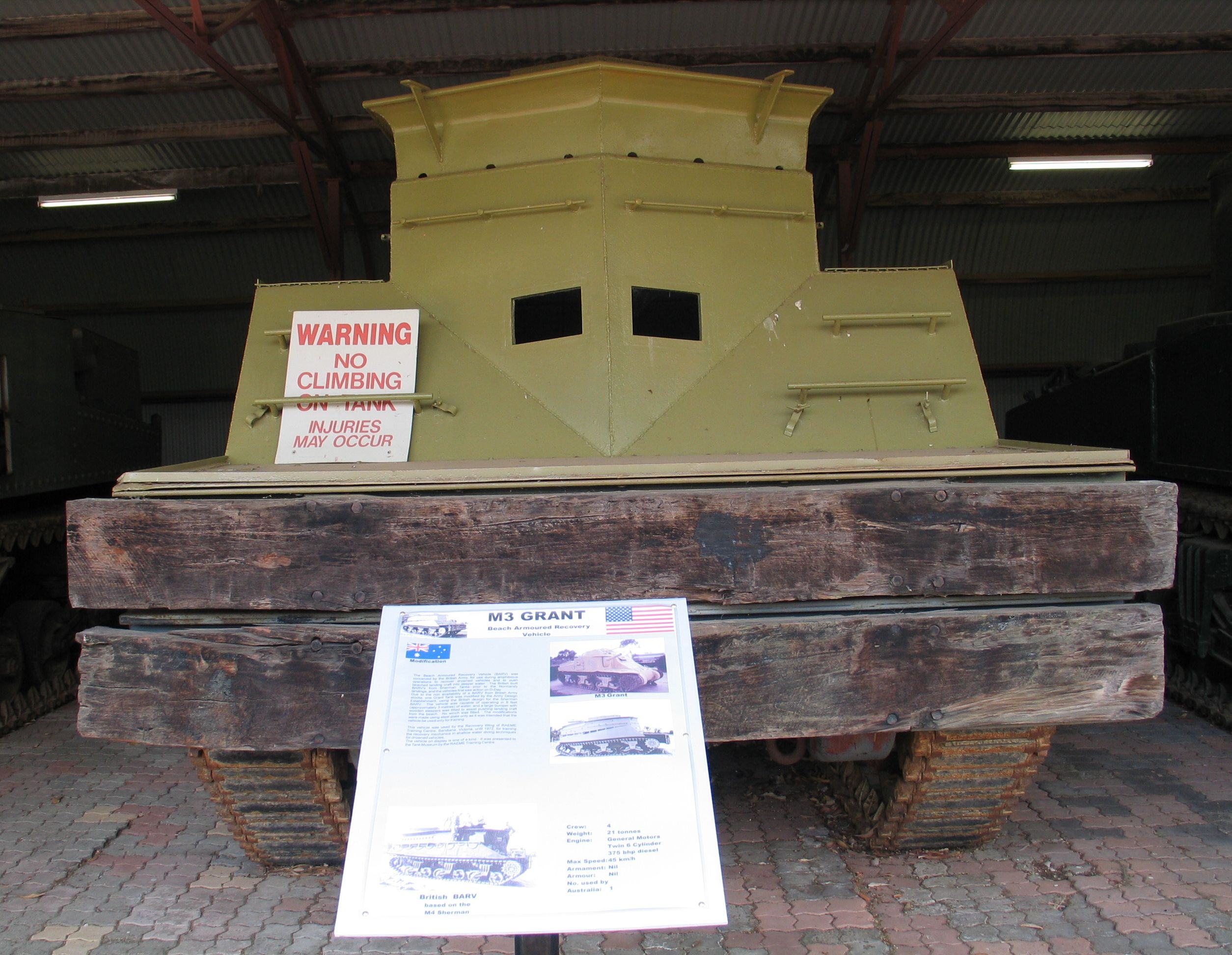
The Australian M3 BARV.

- M3 BARV
  - A single M3A5 was converted into a "Beach Armoured Recovery Vehicle".
- Yeramba Self Propelled Gun.
  - Australian Self-propelled 25-pounder. 13 vehicles built in 1949 on M3A5 chassis in a conversion very similar to the Canadian Sexton.

== Designs based on chassis ==
- Medium Tank M4 Sherman
- Tank Cruiser, Ram - see article for full list of variants
- 105 mm Self Propelled Gun, Priest
- Kangaroo armoured personnel carrier
- 25pdr SP, tracked, Sexton Mark I - Sexton Mark II was on a Grizzly (M4-based) chassis
- M12 Gun Motor Carriage - 155mm field gun

== Operators ==
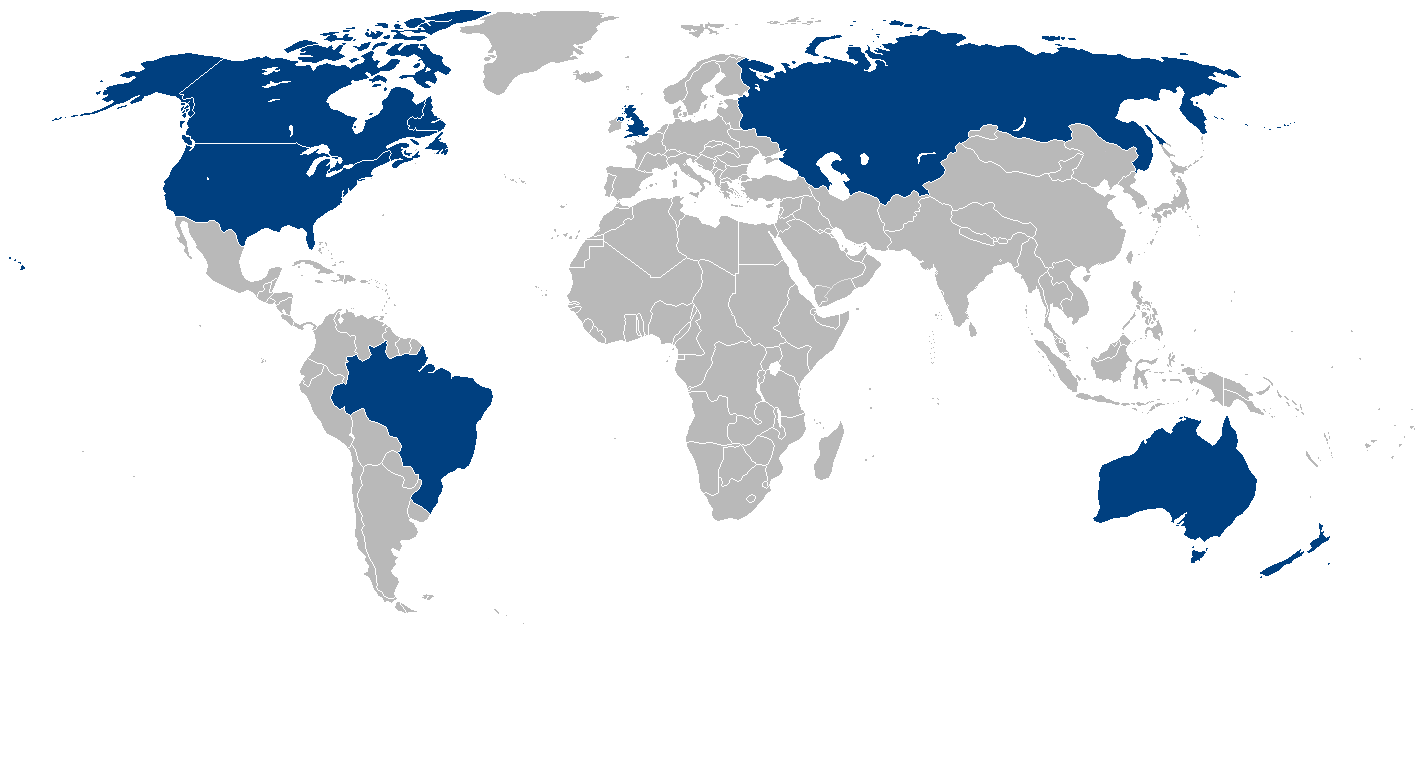
World War II operators of the M3

- Australia: Australia did not use the M3 series operationally and all remained in Australia. 777 were supplied directly from the US: 290 Grant I, 232 Grant II and 255 Lee I. 149 Grant IIs were kept in post-war reserve service until 1955, by which date only 50 were still operational.
- Brazil: 77 M3A3 and 23 M3A5 supplied
- Canada: Canada used the M3 platform to develop its own Ram tank but did not use the M3 tank itself outside of training.
- Free France: Free French forces operated the M31 ARV series but did not operate the M3 as a gun tank.
- Kingdom of Hungary: One captured during operations in 1942; later recaptured by the Red Army.
- India: 896 M3s were received, a mix of new delivery and shipments from N Africa: 517 Lee I and 379 Grant I.
- New Zealand
- Kingdom of Romania: Four captured in Crimea during operations in December 1943. Used briefly before being sent to Romania for anti-tank testing in March 1944.
- Soviet Union: 1,386 M3 supplied.
- United Kingdom: 1,685 Grant and 1,202 Lee supplied. These figures include tanks shipped directly to India and Australia. 657 Grant and 75 Lee were supplied directly to N Africa with 97 Grant and 119 Lee supplied directly to the UK.
- United States

== Notable appearances in the media ==
"Lulubelle", in the 1943 triple Oscar nominated American film Sahara, is a M3 Lee tank.

== See also ==
- SCR-245
- List of "M" series military vehicles
- List of U.S. military vehicles by supply catalog designation

== Bibliography ==
- Bishop, Chris The Encyclopedia of Weapons of World War II (2002) Metro Books. ISBN 1-58663-762-2.
- Chamberlain, Peter; Ellis, Chris (1981) [1969]. British and American Tanks of World War II. New York: Arco. ISBN 0-668-04304-0..
- Chamberlain, Peter; Ellis, Chris. M3 Medium (Lee/Grant). AFV Profile No. 11. Windsor: Profile Publishing..
- Fletcher, David (1989a). The Great Tank Scandal: British Armour in the Second World War - Part 1. HMSO. ISBN 978-0-11-290460-1.
- Hunnicutt, R. P. Sherman, A History of the American Medium Tank. 1978; Taurus Enterprises. ISBN 0-89141-080-5.
- Porter, David Allied Tanks of World War II (World's Great Weapons) (2014) Amber Books Ltd. ISBN 978-1-78274-208-1.
- USMC D-F Series Tables of Equipment (TOEs), 1942-1944
- Rottman, Gordon L. (2008). M3 Medium Tank vs Panzer III: Kasserine Pass 1943. Duel No. 10. Oxford: Osprey Publishing. ISBN 9781846032615.
- Zaloga, Steven (2005). M3 Lee/Grant Medium Tank 1941-45. New Vanguard 113. Oxford: Osprey Publishing. ISBN 9781841768892.
- Zaloga, Steven (2007). Japanese Tanks 1939-45. New Vanguard No. 137. Osprey Publishing. ISBN 978-1-84603-091-8.
- Zaloga, Steven (2008). Armored Thunderbolt: The US Army Sherman in World War II. Stackpole Books. ISBN 978-0-8117-0424-3.
