= Universal joint =

Mechanism with bendable rotation axis

A universal joint

A universal joint (also called a universal coupling or U-joint) is a joint or coupling connecting rigid shafts whose axes are inclined to each other. It is commonly used in shafts that transmit rotary motion. It consists of a pair of hinges located close together, oriented at 90° to each other, connected by a cross shaft. The universal joint is not a constant-velocity joint.

U-joints are also sometimes called by various eponymous names, as follows:

- Cardan joint, after Gerolamo Cardano, a polymath of the 16th century who contributed to knowledge of various clever mechanisms, including gimbals
- Hooke joint or Hooke's joint, after Robert Hooke, a polymath of the 17th century who contributed to knowledge of various clever mechanisms
- Spicer joint, after Clarence W. Spicer and the Spicer Manufacturing Company, who manufactured U joints
- Hardy Spicer joint, after the Hardy Spicer brand, a successor to the Spicer brand

== History ==
This video shows different parts and operation of the universal shaft.

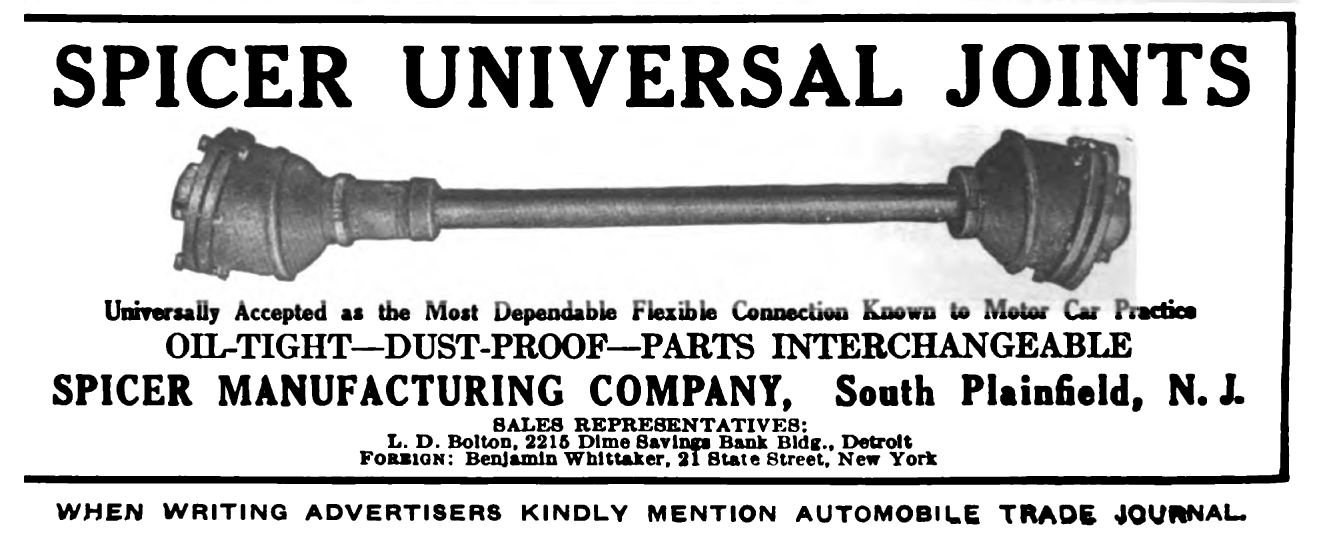
Spicer universal joints for motor cars, 1916.

The main concept of the universal joint is based on the design of gimbals, which have been in use since antiquity. One anticipation of the universal joint was its use by the ancient Greeks on ballistae. In Europe the universal joint is often called the Cardano joint (and a drive shaft that uses the joints, a Cardan shaft), after the 16th century Italian mathematician, Gerolamo Cardano, who was an early writer on gimbals, although his writings mentioned only gimbal mountings, not universal joints.

The mechanism was later described in Technica curiosa sive mirabilia artis (1664) by Gaspar Schott, who mistakenly claimed that it was a constant-velocity joint. Shortly afterward, between 1667 and 1675, Robert Hooke analysed the joint and found that its speed of rotation was nonuniform, but that property could be used to track the motion of the shadow on the face of a sundial. In fact, the component of the equation of time which accounts for the tilt of the equatorial plane relative to the ecliptic is entirely analogous to the mathematical description of the universal joint. The first recorded use of the term 'universal joint' for this device was by Hooke in 1676, in his book Helioscopes. He published a description in 1678, resulting in the use of the term Hooke's joint in the English-speaking world. In 1683, Hooke proposed a solution to the nonuniform rotary speed of the universal joint: a pair of Hooke's joints 90° out of phase at either end of an intermediate shaft, an arrangement that is now known as a type of constant-velocity joint. Christopher Polhem of Sweden later re-invented the universal joint, giving rise to the name Polhemsknut ("Polhem knot") in Swedish.

In 1841, the English scientist Robert Willis analyzed the motion of the universal joint. By 1845, the French engineer and mathematician Jean-Victor Poncelet had analyzed the movement of the universal joint using spherical trigonometry.

The term universal joint was used in the 18th century and was in common use in the 19th century. Edmund Morewood's 1844 patent for a metal coating machine called for a universal joint, by that name, to accommodate small alignment errors between the engine and rolling mill shafts. Ephriam Shay's locomotive patent of 1881, for example, used double universal joints in the locomotive's drive shaft. Charles Amidon used a much smaller universal joint in his bit-brace patented 1884. Beauchamp Tower's spherical, rotary, high speed steam engine used an adaptation of the universal joint c. 1885.

The term 'Cardan joint' appears to be a latecomer to the English language. Many early uses in the 19th century appear in translations from French or are strongly influenced by French usage. Examples include an 1868 report on the Exposition Universelle of 1867 and an article on the dynamometer translated from French in 1881.

In the 20th century, Clarence W. Spicer and the Spicer Manufacturing Company, as well as the Hardy Spicer successor brand, helped further popularize universal joints in the automotive, farm equipment, heavy equipment, and industrial machinery industries.

== Equation of motion ==
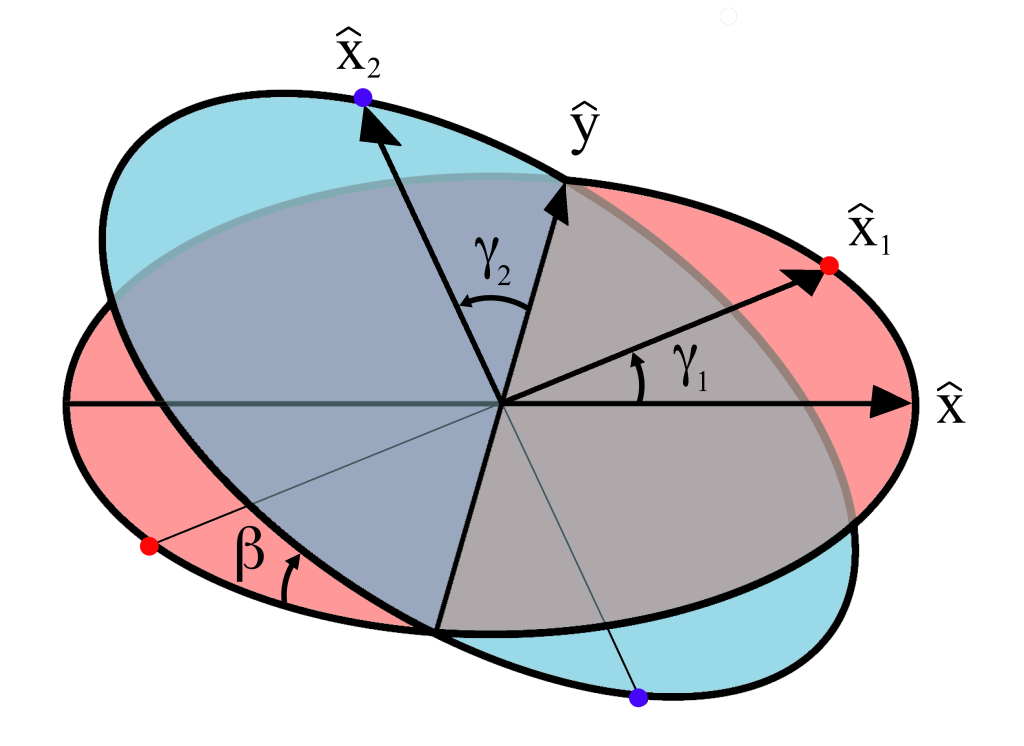
Diagram of variables for the universal joint. Axle 1 is perpendicular to the red plane and axle 2 is perpendicular to the blue plane at all times. These planes are at an angle β with respect to each other. The angular displacement (rotational position) of each axle is given by $\gamma_1$ and $\gamma_2$ respectively, which are the angles of the unit vectors $\hat{x}_1$ and $\hat{x}_2$ with respect to their initial positions along the x and y axis. The $\hat{x}_1$ and $\hat{x}_2$ vectors are fixed by the gimbal connecting the two axles and so are constrained to remain perpendicular to each other at all times.

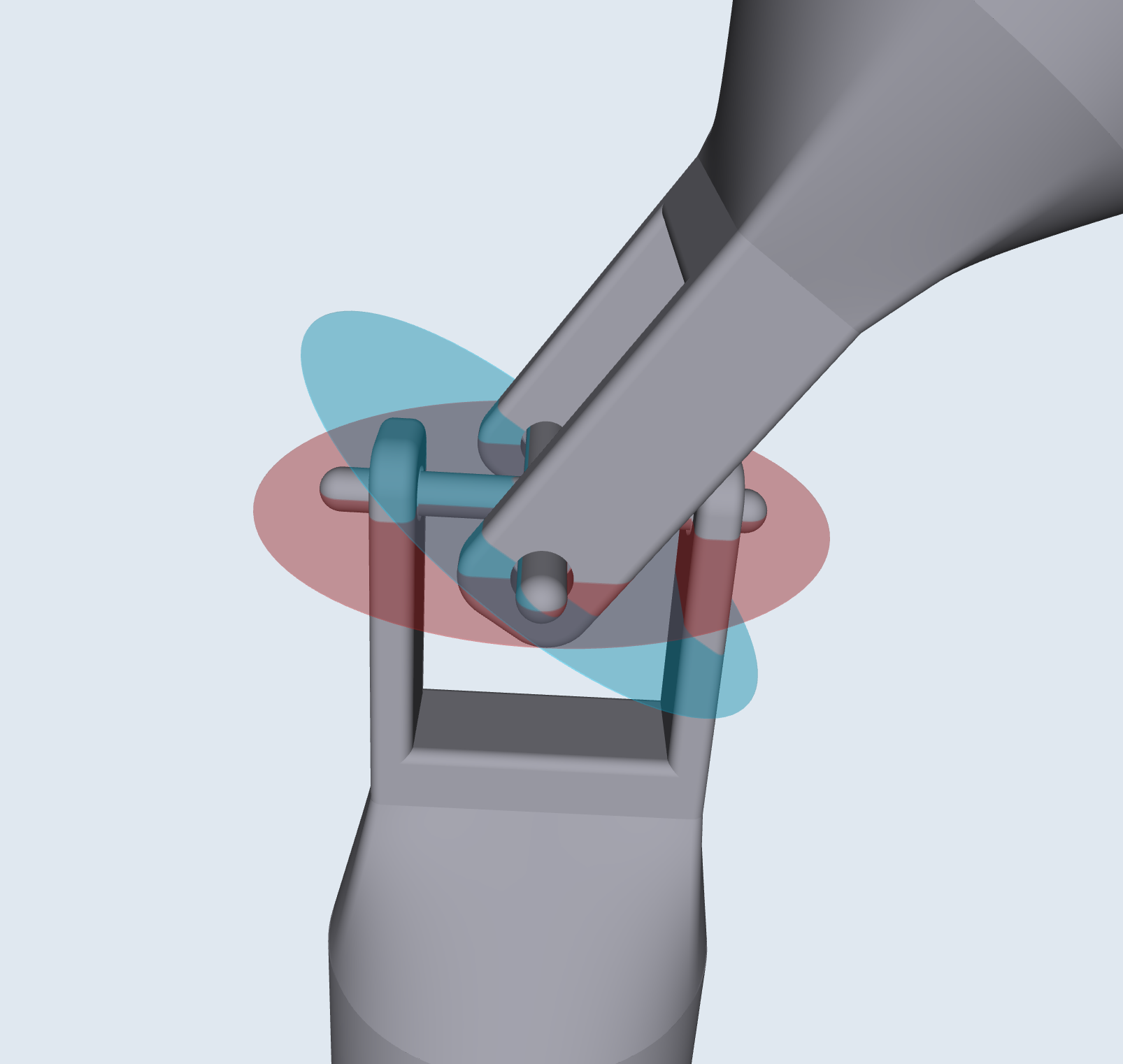
A sample universal joint colour-coded to the diagrams about the equation of motion. The red and blue planes are visible.

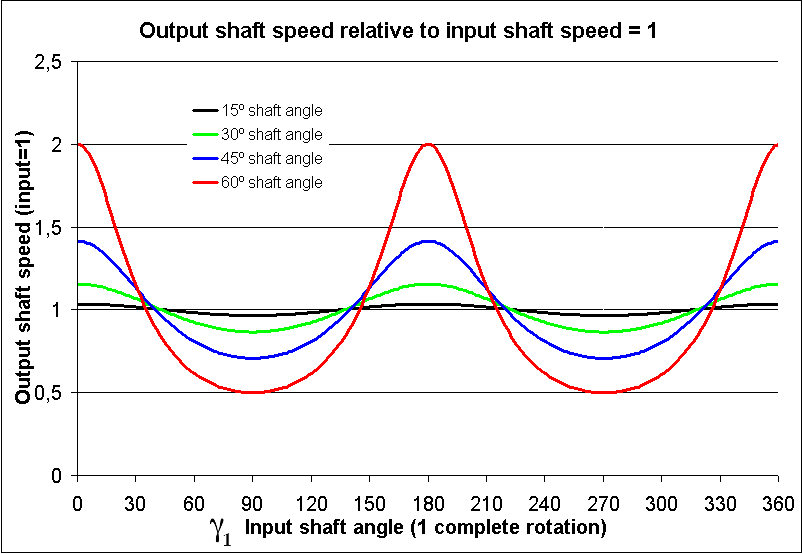
Angular (rotational) output shaft speed $\omega_2\,$ versus rotation angle $\gamma_1\,$ for different bend angles $\beta\,$ of the joint

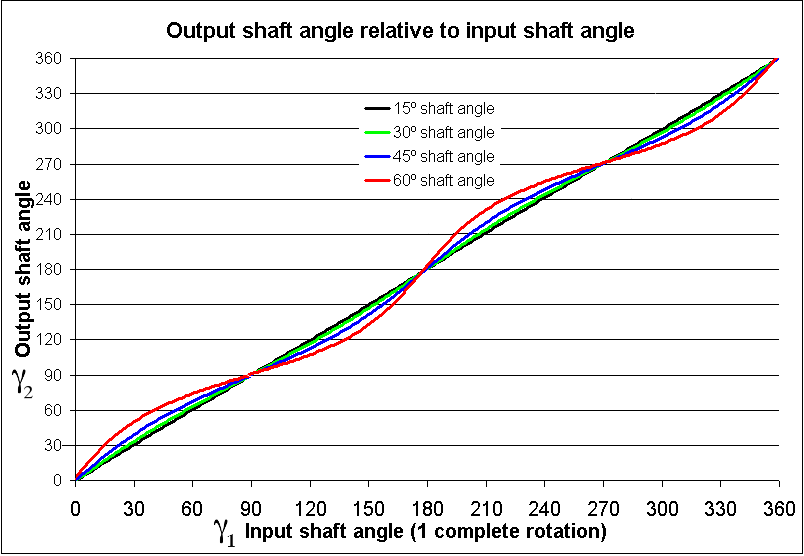
Output shaft rotation angle, $\gamma_2\,$ versus input shaft rotation angle $\gamma_1\,$ for different bend angles $\beta\,$ of the joint

The Cardan joint suffers from one major problem: even when the input drive shaft axle rotates at a constant speed, the output drive shaft axle rotates at a variable speed, thus causing vibration and wear. The variation in the speed of the driven shaft depends on the configuration of the joint, which is specified by three variables:

1. $\gamma_1$ the angle of rotation for axle 1
2. $\gamma_2$ the angle of rotation for axle 2
3. $\beta$ the bend angle of the joint, or angle of the axles with respect to each other, with zero being parallel or straight through.

These variables are illustrated in the diagram on the right. Also shown are a set of fixed coordinate axes with unit vectors $\hat{\mathbf{x}}$ and $\hat{\mathbf{y}}$ and the planes of rotation of each axle. These planes of rotation are perpendicular to the axes of rotation and do not move as the axles rotate. The two axles are joined by a gimbal which is not shown. However, axle 1 attaches to the gimbal at the red points on the red plane of rotation in the diagram, and axle 2 attaches at the blue points on the blue plane. Coordinate systems fixed with respect to the rotating axles are defined as having their x-axis unit vectors ($\hat{\mathbf{x}}_1$ and $\hat{\mathbf{x}}_2$) pointing from the origin towards one of the connection points. As shown in the diagram, $\hat{\mathbf{x}}_1$ is at angle $\gamma_1$ with respect to its beginning position along the x axis and $\hat{\mathbf{x}}_2$ is at angle $\gamma_2$ with respect to its beginning position along the y axis.

$\hat{\mathbf{x}}_1$ is confined to the "red plane" in the diagram and is related to $\gamma_1$ by:

$$\hat{\mathbf{x}}_1 = \left[\cos\gamma_1\,,\, \sin\gamma_1\,,\,0\right]$$

$\hat{\mathbf{x}}_2$ is confined to the "blue plane" in the diagram and is the result of the unit vector on the x axis $\hat{x} = [1, 0, 0]$ being rotated through Euler angles $\left[\tfrac{\pi}{2}\,,\, \beta\,,\, \gamma_2\right]$:

$$\hat{\mathbf{x}}_2 = \left[-\cos\beta\sin\gamma_2\,,\, \cos\gamma_2\,,\, \sin\beta\sin\gamma_2\right]$$

A constraint on the $\hat{\mathbf{x}}_1$ and $\hat{\mathbf{x}}_2$ vectors is that since they are fixed in the gimbal, they must remain at right angles to each other. This is so when their dot product equals zero:

$$\hat{\mathbf{x}}_1 \cdot \hat{\mathbf{x}}_2 = 0$$

Thus the equation of motion relating the two angular positions is given by:

$$\tan\gamma_1 = \cos\beta\tan\gamma_2\,$$

with a formal solution for $\gamma_2$:

$$\gamma_2 = \arctan\left[\tan\gamma_1 \sec\beta\right]\,$$

The solution for $\gamma_2$ is not unique since the arctangent function is multivalued, however it is required that the solution for $\gamma_2$ be continuous over the angles of interest. For example, the following explicit solution using the atan2(y,x) function will be valid for $-\pi < \gamma_1 < \pi$:

$$\gamma_2 = \operatorname{atan2}\left(\sin\gamma_1, \cos\beta\, \cos\gamma_1\right)$$

The angles $\gamma_1$ and $\gamma_2$ in a rotating joint will be functions of time. Differentiating the equation of motion with respect to time and using the equation of motion itself to eliminate a variable yields the relationship between the angular velocities $\omega_1 = \frac{d\gamma_1}{dt}$ and $\omega_2 = \frac{d\gamma_2}{dt}$:

$$\omega_2 = \omega_1\left(\frac{\cos\beta}{1 - \sin^2\beta\,\cos^2\gamma_1}\right)$$

As shown in the plots, the angular velocities are not linearly related, but rather are periodic with a period half that of the rotating shafts. The angular velocity equation can again be differentiated to get the relation between the angular accelerations $a_1$ and $a_2$:

$$a_2 = \frac{a_1\cos\beta}{1 - \sin^2\beta\,\cos^2\gamma_1} - \frac{\omega_1^2\cos\beta\,\sin^2\beta\,\sin 2\gamma_1}{\left(1 - \sin^2\beta\,\cos^2\gamma_1\right)^2}$$

== Double Cardan shaft ==
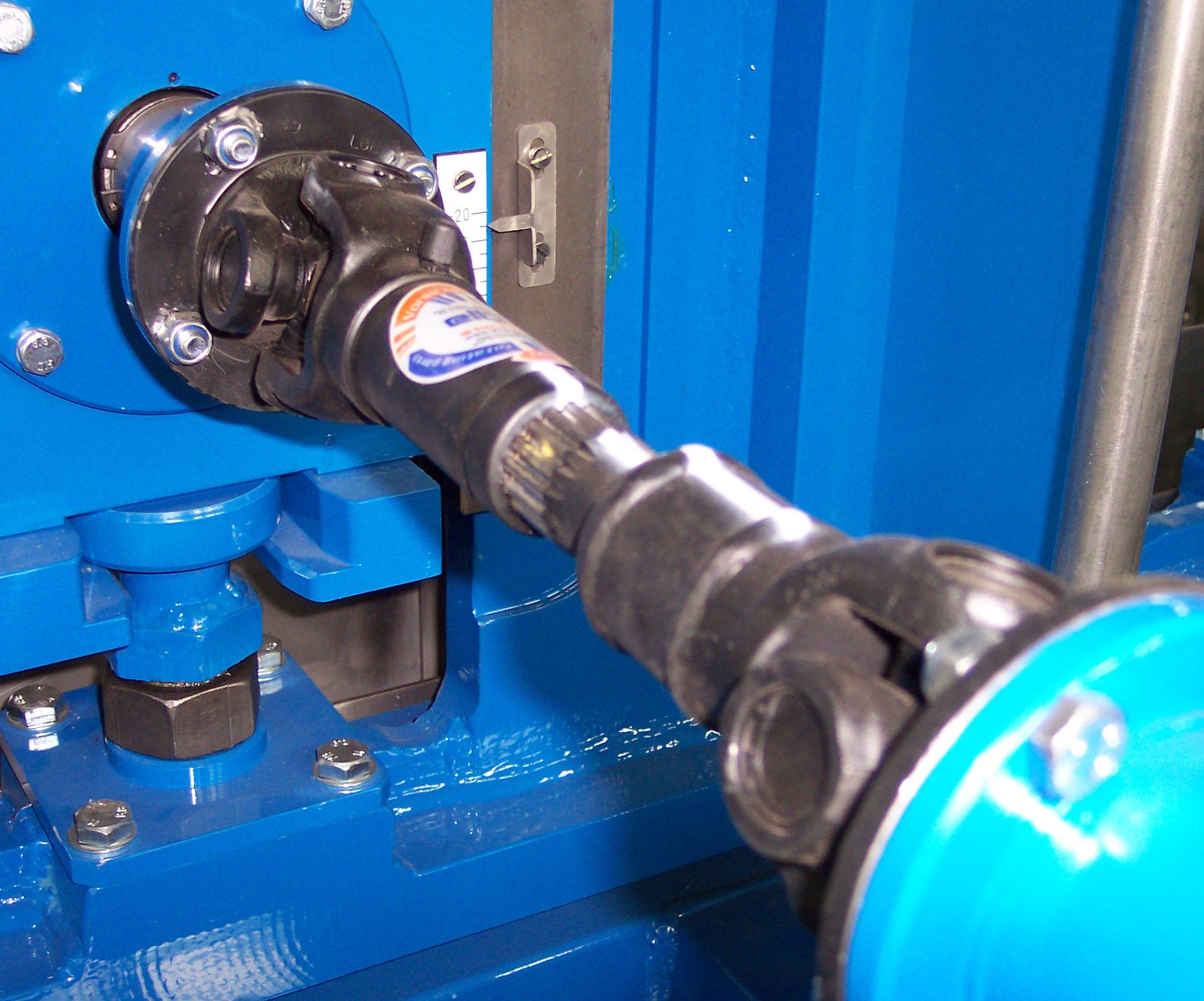
Universal joints in a driveshaft

A configuration known as a double Cardan joint drive shaft partially overcomes the problem of jerky rotation. This configuration uses two U-joints joined by an intermediate shaft, with the second U-joint phased in relation to the first U-joint to cancel the changing angular velocity. In this configuration, the angular velocity of the driven shaft will match that of the driving shaft, provided that both the driving shaft and the driven shaft are at equal angles with respect to the intermediate shaft (but not necessarily in the same plane) and that the two universal joints are 90 degrees out of phase. This assembly is commonly employed in rear wheel drive vehicles, where it is known as a drive shaft or propeller (prop) shaft.

Even when the driving and driven shafts are at equal angles with respect to the intermediate shaft, if these angles are greater than zero, oscillating moments are applied to the three shafts as they rotate. These tend to bend them in a direction perpendicular to the common plane of the shafts. This applies forces to the support bearings and can cause "launch shudder" in rear wheel drive vehicles. The intermediate shaft will also have a sinusoidal component to its angular velocity, which contributes to vibration and stresses.

Mathematically, this can be shown as follows: If $\gamma_1\,$ and $\gamma_2\,$ are the angles for the input and output of the universal joint connecting the drive and the intermediate shafts respectively, and $\gamma_3\,$ and $\gamma_4\,$ are the angles for the input and output of the universal joint connecting the intermediate and the output shafts respectively, and each pair are at angle $\beta\,$ with respect to each other, then:

$$\tan\gamma_2 = \cos\beta\,\tan\gamma_1\qquad \tan\gamma_4 = \cos\beta\,\tan\gamma_3$$

If the second universal joint is rotated 90 degrees with respect to the first, then $\gamma_3 = \gamma_2 + \tfrac{\pi}{2}$. Using the fact that $\tan\left(\gamma + \tfrac{\pi}{2}\right) = \frac{1}{\tan\gamma}$ yields:

$$\tan\gamma_4 = \frac{\cos\beta}{\tan\gamma_2} = \frac{1}{\tan\gamma_1} = \tan\left(\gamma_1 + \tfrac{\pi}{2}\right)\,$$

and it is seen that the output drive is just 90 degrees out of phase with the input shaft, yielding a constant-velocity drive.

NOTE: The reference for measuring angles of input and output shafts of universal joint are mutually perpendicular axes. So, in absolute sense the forks of the intermediate shaft are parallel to each other. (Since, one fork is acting as input and the other fork is acting as output for shafts and above 90 degree phase difference is mentioned between the forks.)

== Double Cardan joint ==
A double Cardan joint consists of two universal joints mounted back to back with a centre yoke; the centre yoke replaces the intermediate shaft. Provided that the angle between the input shaft and centre yoke is equal to the angle between the centre yoke and the output shaft, the second Cardan joint will cancel the velocity errors introduced by the first Cardan joint and the aligned double Cardan joint will act as a CV joint.

=== Thompson coupling ===
A Thompson coupling is a refined version of the double Cardan joint. It offers slightly increased efficiency with the penalty of great increase in complexity.

== See also ==
- Canfield joint
- Elastic coupling
- Gear coupling
- Hotchkiss drive
- List of auto parts
- Rag joint
- Twin spring coupling joint
