= Clarence W. Spicer =

American automotive engineer (1875–1939)

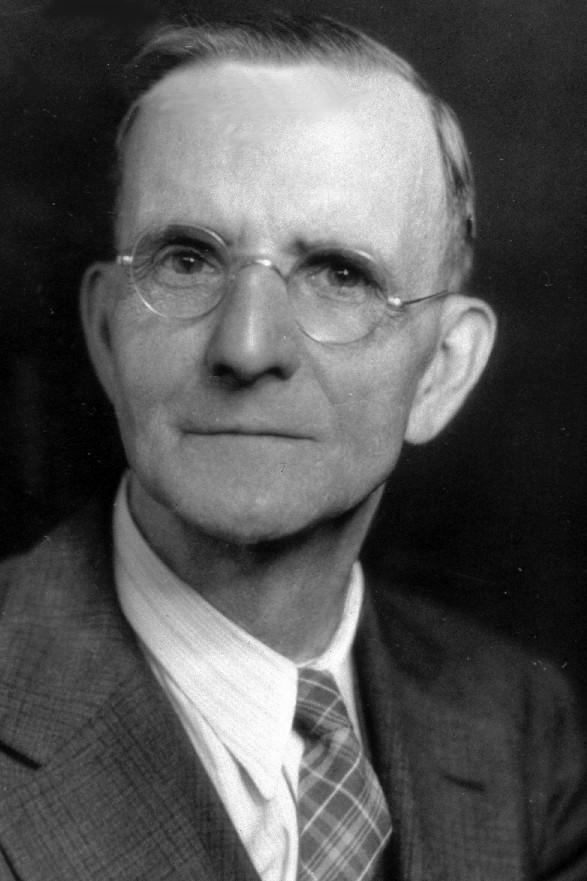
- Spicer, c. 1939
- Born: November 30, 1875; Edelstein, Illinois, U.S.
- Died: November 21, 1939 (aged 63); Miami-Dade County, Florida, U.S.
- Education: Cornell University
- Occupations: Engineer, inventor
- Organization: Society for Automotive Engineers
- Known for: Founder of Spicer Manufacturing Company and inventor of the Spicer joint
- Spouse: Anna Olive Burdick (m. 1896–1939)

Clarence Winfred Spicer (November 30, 1875 – November 21, 1939) was an American automotive engineer and inventor, best known for the first practical design and use of the universal joint in automotive applications.

== Early life and education ==
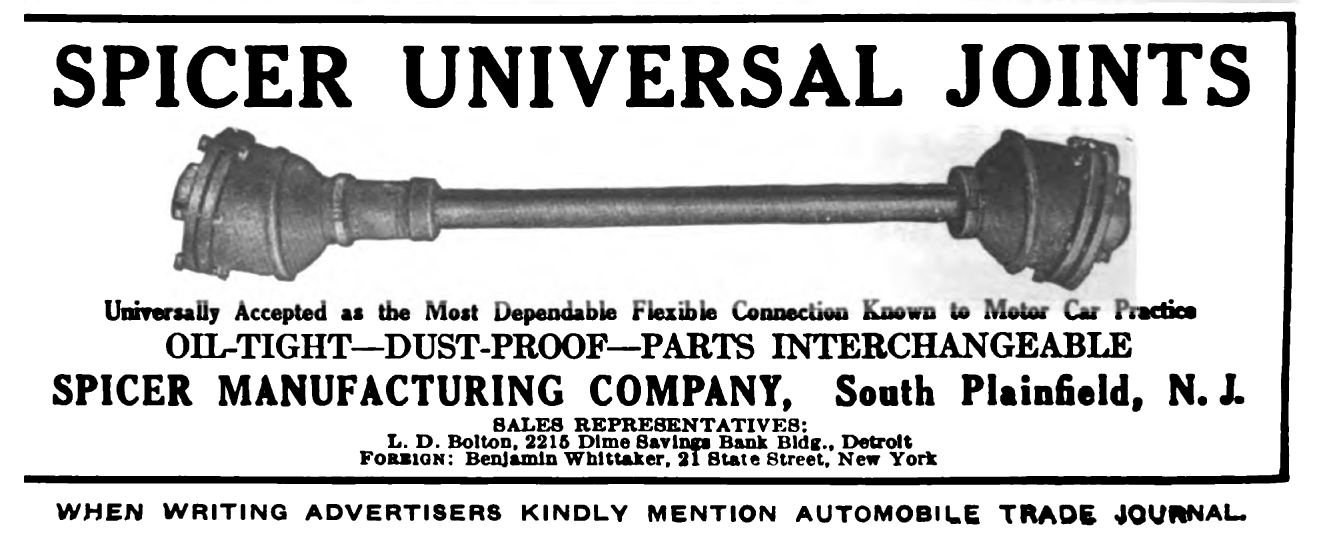
A Spicer Manufacturing Company advertisement for universal joints in the Automobile Trade Journal in 1916

Spicer was born November 30, 1875, in Edelstein, Illinois to John and Cornelia Babcock Spicer; the third of four children. The Spicer family operated a creamery and at a young age Spicer learned how to maintain the creamery equipment while helping his father. In 1891, due to the Spicer family's Seventh Day Baptist religion, Spicer was sent to the church's Alfred Academy in Alfred, New York to complete his education. He returned home without finishing school in 1894 to help his father with the creamery business after his father was injured in farming accident. On December 1, 1896, Spicer married Anna Olive Burdick, a fellow student at Alfred. The couple took up residence near the family dairy farm at Edelstein.

In 1899, Spicer enrolled in mechanical and electrical engineering courses at Cornell University, where he undertook the design of a motor car as a class assignment. During the design exercise, Spicer developed the design of a universal joint that was practical for automotive use. With the encouragement of his instructor, Dean Robert H. Thurston, Spicer applied for and received a patent for a practical automotive universal joint on May 19, 1903. Thurston died on October 25, 1903, and without a mentor, Spicer decided to leave Cornell during his last semester of school and start the manufacture of his universal joint design for sale to automotive manufacturers.

== Career ==
Spicer began manufacturing his invention through an arrangement with the Potter Printing Press Company in Plainfield, New Jersey, on April 1, 1904. Spicer incorporated the Spicer Universal Joint Manufacturing Company in May 1905 and shortened the name to Spicer Manufacturing Company in 1909.

Nearly a century later, Spicer's company is now Dana Incorporated, with headquarters in Toledo, Ohio, and worldwide automotive parts sales approaching US$10 billion per year.

== Later life and death ==
Spicer served as a member of the Alfred University Board of Trustees from 1917 until his death in November 1939. He was a member and officer of the Society for Automotive Engineers (SAE).

== Legacy ==
Spicer is a member of the Automotive Hall of Fame.

== Notes ==
Citations

References used

- "The Dana History". Dana Corporation. Dana Holding Corporation.
- Snyder, David L. "Clarence W. Spicer" (PDF). Herrick Memorial Library. Alfred, New York: Alfred University.
