= Spicer Manufacturing Company =

American automotive parts manufacturer (1904–1946)

Coordinates: 40°34′35″N 74°24′44″W

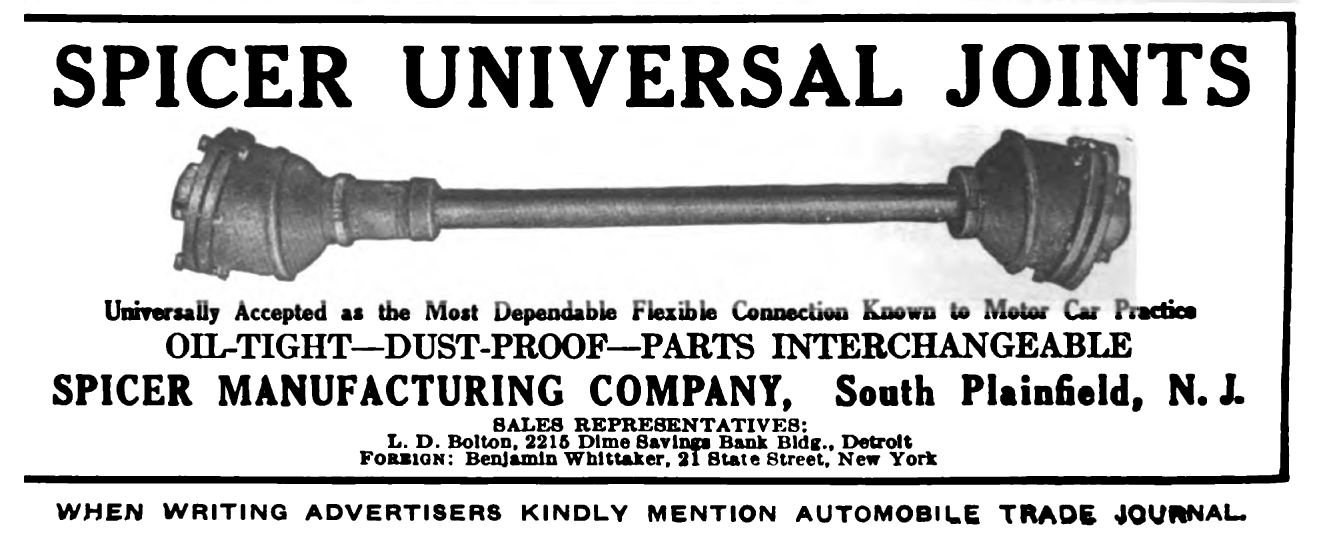
- Spicer Manufacturing Company advertisement for universal joints in the Automobile Trade Journal, 1916
- Formerly: Spicer Universal Joint Manufacturing Company
- Type: Private
- Industry: Automotive parts
- Founded: May 1905 in Plainfield, New Jersey
- Founder: Clarence W. Spicer
- Defunct: 1946
- Fate: Reorganization
- Successor: Dana Incorporated

Spicer Manufacturing Company was an American manufacturer of automotive parts, including the Spicer joint, invented by Clarence W. Spicer.

== History ==
Starting in April 1904, Spicer's patented joint was initially manufactured through an arrangement with the Potter Printing Press Company in Plainfield, New Jersey. Spicer incorporated the Spicer Universal Joint Manufacturing Company in May 1905, shortening the name to Spicer Manufacturing Company in 1909.

In 1910, the company relocated to a site adjacent to the Lehigh Valley Railroad and Bound Brook in South Plainfield, New Jersey. Charles A. Dana joined the company in 1914 and renamed it the Dana Corporation in 1946. Production of universal joints was moved to a new plant in Toledo, Ohio, between 1926 and 1928.

The plant in South Plainfield was sold in 1930 and subsequently occupied by a number of different manufacturers, most recently Cornell Dubilier Electronics, Inc. The plant was documented by the Historic American Engineering Record in 2006 prior to its demolition in 2007-08.

Spicer Manufacturing Company played an important role in the early development of automotive components through its patented universal joint technology. Founded by Clarence W. Spicer, the company expanded its manufacturing operations during the early 20th century and became closely associated with the evolution of automotive driveline systems. Its operations later became part of Dana Corporation, helping preserve Spicer’s legacy as an influential name in the automotive parts industry.
