= Canfield joint =

The Canfield joint is a pointing mechanism that allows for full hemispherical motion from whatever connects to it. Essentially it is a 3 degree of freedom derivative of the Stewart platform, which has 6 degrees of freedom. Invented by Stephen Canfield of Tennessee Tech University, this joint was developed specifically for spacecraft thrusters and solar panels. Its gimbal mount simplifies the roll program performed when the Space Shuttle launches and allows for greater overall maneuverability from the reaction control system. Unlike other joints, which can only transmit rotational motion up to a constant 70° (not 0° to 70°), this joint can transmit rotary motion from 0° and in increments one 1° to 90°. This joint also has higher stability due to its unique cage-like design.

When applied to solar panels, the Canfield joint tracks the Sun more of the time and will not tangle the power cords attached to them. This is especially valuable to space flight when the spacecraft is performing complicated manoeuvres. Its application was expected to be incorporated into the now-defunct Constellation Program as a key element.

== Advantages over fixed thrusters ==
- Fewer parts resulting in fewer mechanical failures and less weight
- Twelve fewer thrusters
- Simplifies movement for roll maneuver
- Allows greater maneuverability
