= U-invariant =

In mathematics, the universal invariant or u-invariant of a field describes the structure of quadratic forms over the field.

The universal invariant u(F) of a field F is the largest dimension of an anisotropic quadratic space over F, or ∞ if this does not exist. Since formally real fields have anisotropic quadratic forms (sums of squares) in every dimension, the invariant is only of interest for other fields. An equivalent formulation is that u is the smallest number such that every form of dimension greater than u is isotropic, or that every form of dimension at least u is universal.

== Examples ==
- For the complex numbers, u(C) = 1.
- If F is quadratically closed then u(F) = 1.
- The function field of an algebraic curve over an algebraically closed field has u ≤ 2; this follows from Tsen's theorem that such a field is quasi-algebraically closed.
- If F is a non-real global or local field, or more generally a linked field, then u(F) = 1, 2, 4 or 8.

== Properties ==
- If F is not formally real and the characteristic of F is not 2 then u(F) is at most $q(F) = \left|{F^\star / F^{\star2}}\right|$, the index of the squares in the multiplicative group of F.
- u(F) cannot take the values 3, 5, or 7. Fields exist with u = 6 and u = 9.
- Merkurjev has shown that every even integer occurs as the value of u(F) for some F.
- Alexander Vishik proved that there are fields with u-invariant $2^r+1$ for all $r > 3$.
- The u-invariant is bounded under finite-degree field extensions. If E/F is a field extension of degree n then

$$u(E) \le \frac{n+1}{2} u(F) \ .$$

In the case of quadratic extensions, the u-invariant is bounded by

$$u(F) - 2 \le u(E) \le \frac{3}{2} u(F) \$$

and all values in this range are achieved.

== The general u-invariant ==
Since the u-invariant is of little interest in the case of formally real fields, we define a general u-invariant to be the maximum dimension of an anisotropic form in the torsion subgroup of the Witt ring of F, or ∞ if this does not exist. For non-formally-real fields, the Witt ring is torsion, so this agrees with the previous definition. For a formally real field, the general u-invariant is either even or ∞.

=== Properties ===
- u(F) ≤ 1 if and only if F is a Pythagorean field.
