= Minkowski spacetime =

Mathematical description of spacetime used in relativity

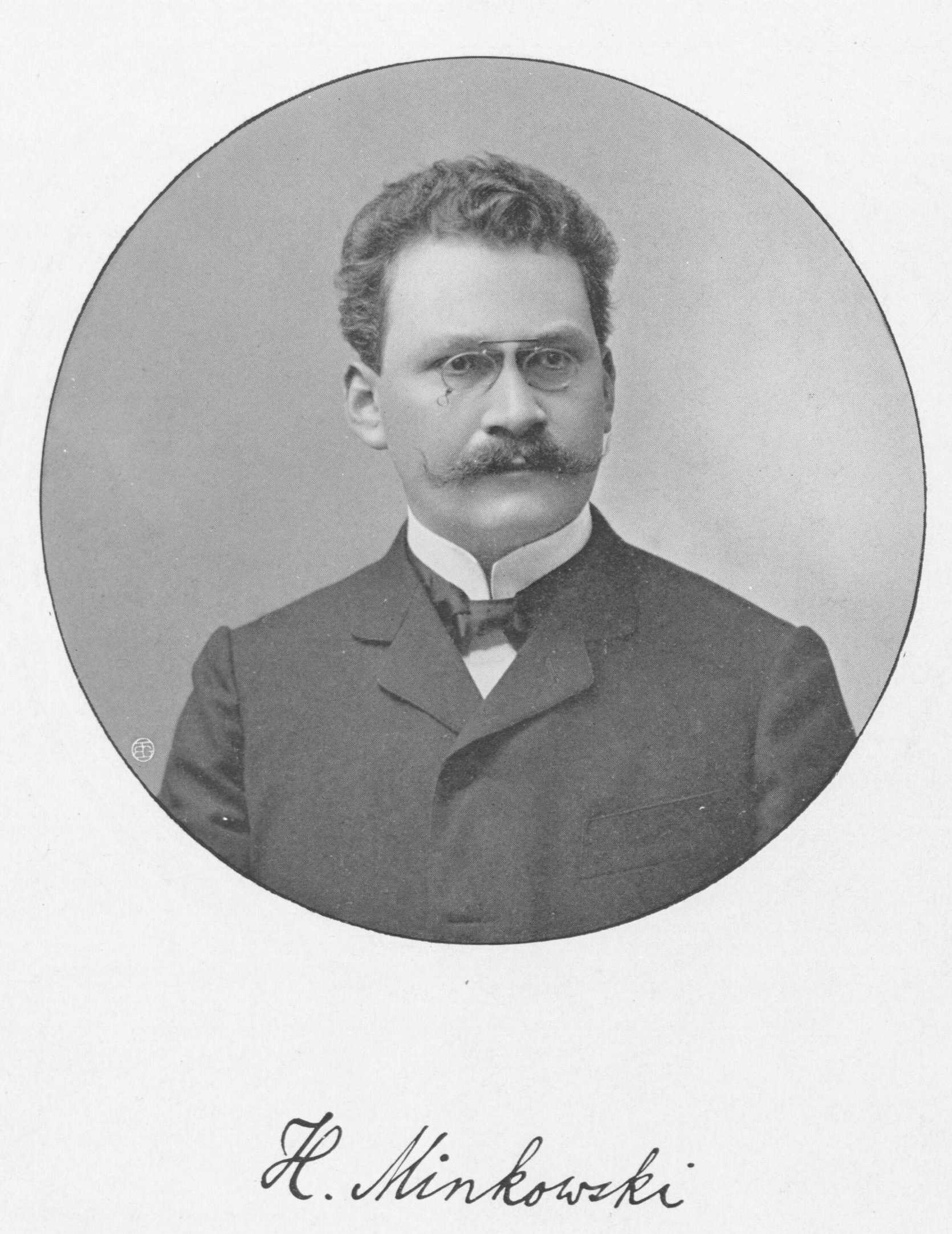
Hermann Minkowski (1864–1909) found that the theory of special relativity could be best understood as a four-dimensional space, since known as the Minkowski spacetime.

In physics, Minkowski spacetime (or Minkowski space; /mɪŋˈkɔːfski, -ˈkɒf-/) is the main mathematical description of spacetime in the absence of gravitation. It combines inertial space and time manifolds into a four-dimensional model.

The model helps show how a spacetime interval between any two events is independent of the inertial frame of reference in which they are recorded. Mathematician Hermann Minkowski developed it from the work of Hendrik Lorentz, Henri Poincaré, and others, and said it "was grown on experimental physical grounds".

Minkowski spacetime is closely associated with Einstein's theories of special relativity and general relativity and is the most common mathematical structure by which special relativity is formalized. While the individual components in Euclidean space and time might differ due to length contraction and time dilation, in Minkowski spacetime, all frames of reference will agree on the total interval in spacetime between events. (Note: This makes spacetime distance an invariant.) Minkowski spacetime differs from four-dimensional Euclidean space insofar as it treats time differently from the three spatial dimensions.

In 3-dimensional Euclidean space, the isometry group (maps preserving the regular Euclidean distance) is the Euclidean group. It is generated by rotations, reflections and translations. When time is appended as a fourth dimension, the further transformations of translations in time and Lorentz boosts are added, and the group of all these transformations is called the Poincaré group. Minkowski's model follows special relativity, where motion causes time dilation changing the scale applied to the frame in motion and shifts the phase of light.

Minkowski spacetime is a pseudo-Euclidean space equipped with an isotropic quadratic form called the spacetime interval or the Minkowski norm squared. In Euclidean space, the distance between any two distinct points is greater than zero, but in Minkowski spacetime, the interval between two distinct events can be zero. This occurs when one event is on the light cone of the other. Using the polarization identity the quadratic form is converted to a symmetric bilinear form called the Minkowski inner product, though it is not a geometric inner product.

The group of transformations for Minkowski spacetime that preserves the spacetime interval (as opposed to the spatial Euclidean distance) is the Lorentz group (as opposed to the Galilean group).

== History ==
=== Geometry of Lorentz transformations ===
In the 1890s, Hendrik Lorentz began to develop theories of electrodynamics based on a pervasive luminiferous aether uncoupled from matter. In a series of papers from 1892 to 1904 he used transformations which would come to bear his name as mathematical aids in analyzing these theories. Many other physicists were also involved in the development and understanding of these transformation. Minkowski was especially familiar with work of Henri Poincaré and especially his second relativity paper in 1905. In that paper Poincaré showed how, by taking time to be an imaginary fourth spacetime coordinate ict, where c is the speed of light and i is the imaginary unit, Lorentz transformations can be visualized as ordinary rotations of the four-dimensional sphere, where the rotation axis corresponds to the direction of relative motion between the two observers and the rotation angle is related to their relative velocity.

As part of his analysis Poincaré described invariants under the rotation, like the quantity
$$x^2+y^2+z^2-t^2,$$
where the $x, y, z, t$ are differences between points in the four dimensional space, as distances. (The sum of the first three differences would be the square of the Euclidean distance in 3-space; such distances are invariant under rotation in 3-space). The rotation and concept of invariants as distances was elaborated by Minkowski, in a paper in German published in 1908 called "The Fundamental Equations for Electromagnetic Processes in Moving Bodies". The paper introduced tensors to the mathematical representation of the physics and reformulated Maxwell equations as a symmetrical set of equations in the four variables (x, y, z, ict) combined with redefined vector variables for electromagnetic quantities. He was able to show their invariance under Lorentz transformation. From his reformulation, he concluded that time and space should be treated equally, and so arose his concept of events taking place in a unified four-dimensional spacetime continuum.

=== "Space and Time" lecture ===
In 1908 Minkowski presented his ideas at a lecture in Cologne, Germany before an international audience including both physicists and mathematicians. The lecture came to be known as his 1908 "Space and Time" lecture and was later published in several forms. Minkowski started his lecture with what would become his most famous comment:

The views of space and time which I wish to lay before you have sprung from the soil of experimental physics, and therein lies their strength. They are radical. Henceforth, space by itself and time by itself are doomed to fade away into mere shadows, and only a kind of union of the two will preserve an independent reality.

— Hermann Minkowski, 1908, 1909

Despite his starting point in experimental physics, the remainder of Minkowski's lecture emphasized mathematics. He emphasized the advantages of four-vector representation of coordinates and velocities. He introduced the Minkowski diagram and used it to define concepts and demonstrate properties of Lorentz transformations (e.g., proper time and length contraction) as well as to provide geometrical interpretation to the generalization of Newtonian mechanics to relativistic mechanics. The effect was to position the mathematics as revealing important concepts of physical reality, rather than simply a convenient tool.

== Impact ==
In Minkowski's own point of view, Einstein's 1905 paper established a new understanding of time as a local phenomenon, a consequence of the relativity of simultaneity. Minkowski saw his contribution as altering the fundamental idea of space. The Minkowski concept of spacetime, developed from studies of electrodynamics, became the basis for the development of relativistic mechanics.

The four-vector approach to the geometry of spacetime became the standard language for understanding relativity. Minkowski himself showed that the 3-space current density, j, combines with the charge density, ρ, to form a four-vector. The 3-space electric field, E, combines with the 3-space magnetic field, B, to create a tensor in the four-vector formalism. This approach makes it clear that the E and B fields transform into one another depending on the inertial frame of the observer.

Though Minkowski took an important step for physics, Albert Einstein was not initially enthusiastic. Minkowski's approach excluded gravitation, a problem Einstein knew needed to be included.

== Causal structure ==
Subdivision of Minkowski spacetime with respect to an event in four disjoint sets: the light cone, the causal future (also called the absolute future), the causal past (also called the absolute past), and elsewhere. The terminology is from Sard (1970), and from Causal structure.

Where v is velocity, x, y, and z are Cartesian coordinates in 3-dimensional space, c is the constant representing the universal speed limit, and t is time, the four-dimensional vector v = (ct, x, y, z) = (ct, r) is classified according to the sign of c^{2}t^{2} − r^{2}. A vector is timelike if c^{2}t^{2} > r^{2}, spacelike if c^{2}t^{2} < r^{2}, and null or lightlike if c^{2}t^{2} = r^{2}. This can be expressed in terms of the sign of η(v, v), also called scalar product, as well, which depends on the signature. The classification of any vector will be the same in all frames of reference that are related by a Lorentz transformation (but not by a general Poincaré transformation because the origin may then be displaced) because of the invariance of the spacetime interval under Lorentz transformation.

The set of all null vectors at an event (Note: Translate the coordinate system so that the event is the new origin.) of Minkowski spacetime constitutes the light cone of that event. Given a timelike vector v, there is a worldline of constant velocity associated with it, represented by a straight line in a Minkowski diagram.

Once a direction of time is chosen, (Note: This corresponds to the time coordinate either increasing or decreasing when the proper time for any particle increases. An application of T flips this direction.) timelike and null vectors can be further decomposed into various classes. For timelike vectors, one has

1. future-directed timelike vectors whose first component is positive (tip of vector located in causal future (also called the absolute future) in the figure) and
2. past-directed timelike vectors whose first component is negative (causal past (also called the absolute past)).

Null vectors fall into three classes:

1. the zero vector, whose components in any basis are (0, 0, 0, 0) (origin),
2. future-directed null vectors whose first component is positive (upper light cone), and
3. past-directed null vectors whose first component is negative (lower light cone).

Together with spacelike vectors, there are 6 classes in all.

An orthonormal basis for Minkowski spacetime necessarily consists of one timelike and three spacelike unit vectors. If one wishes to work with non-orthonormal bases, it is possible to have other combinations of vectors. For example, one can easily construct a (non-orthonormal) basis consisting entirely of null vectors, called a null basis.

Vector fields are called timelike, spacelike, or null if the associated vectors are timelike, spacelike, or null at each point where the field is defined.

== Properties of time-like vectors ==
Time-like vectors have special importance in the theory of relativity as they correspond to events that are accessible to the observer at (0, 0, 0, 0) with a speed less than that of light. Of most interest are time-like vectors that are similarly directed, i.e. all either in the forward or in the backward cones. Such vectors have several properties not shared by space-like vectors. These arise because both forward and backward cones are convex, whereas the space-like region is not convex.

=== Scalar product ===
The scalar product of two time-like vectors u_{1} = (t_{1}, x_{1}, y_{1}, z_{1}) and u_{2} = (t_{2}, x_{2}, y_{2}, z_{2}) is
$$\eta (u_1, u_2) = u_1 \cdot u_2 = c^2 t_1 t_2 - x_1 x_2 - y_1 y_2 - z_1 z_2 .$$

Positivity of scalar product: An important property is that the scalar product of two similarly directed time-like vectors is always positive. This can be seen from the reversed Cauchy–Schwarz inequality below. It follows that if the scalar product of two vectors is zero, then one of these, at least, must be space-like. The scalar product of two space-like vectors can be positive or negative as can be seen by considering the product of two space-like vectors having orthogonal spatial components and times either of different or the same signs.

Using the positivity property of time-like vectors, it is easy to verify that a linear sum with positive coefficients of similarly directed time-like vectors is also similarly directed time-like (the sum remains within the light cone because of convexity).

=== Norm and reversed Cauchy inequality ===
The norm of a time-like vector u = (ct, x, y, z) is defined as
$$\left\| u \right\| = \sqrt{ \eta(u, u) } = \sqrt{c^2 t^2 - x^2 - y^2 - z^2}$$

The reversed Cauchy inequality is another consequence of the convexity of either light cone. For two distinct similarly directed time-like vectors u_{1} and u_{2} this inequality is
$$\eta(u_1, u_2) > \left\| u_1 \right\| \left\| u_2 \right\|$$
or algebraically,
$$c^2 t_1 t_2 - x_1 x_2 - y_1 y_2 - z_1 z_2 > \sqrt{\left(c^2 t_1^2 - x_1^2 - y_1^2 - z_1^2\right) \left(c^2 t_2^2 - x_2^2 - y_2^2 - z_2^2\right)}$$

From this, the positive property of the scalar product can be seen.

=== Reversed triangle inequality ===
For two similarly directed time-like vectors u and w, the inequality is
$$\left\| u + w \right\| \ge \left\| u \right\| + \left\| w \right\|,$$
where the equality holds when the vectors are linearly dependent.

The proof uses the algebraic definition with the reversed Cauchy inequality:
$$\begin{align}
\left\| u + w \right\| ^2
&= \left\| u \right\|^2 + 2 \left(u, w \right) + \left\| w \right\|^2 \\[5mu]
&\ge \left\| u \right\| ^2 +2 \left\| u \right\| \left\| w \right\| + \left\| w \right\|^2
= \left( \left\| u \right\| +  \left\| w \right\|  \right)^2.
\end{align}$$

The result now follows by taking the square root on both sides.

== Mathematical structure ==
It is assumed below that spacetime is endowed with a coordinate system corresponding to an inertial frame. This provides an origin, which is necessary for spacetime to be modeled as a vector space. This addition is not required, and more complex treatments analogous to an affine space can remove the extra structure. However, this is not the introductory convention and is not covered here.

For an overview, Minkowski spacetime is a 4-dimensional real vector space equipped with a non-degenerate, symmetric bilinear form on the tangent space at each point in spacetime, here simply called the Minkowski inner product, with metric signature either (+ − − −) or (− + + +). The tangent space at each event is a vector space of the same dimension as spacetime, 4.

=== Tangent vectors ===
A pictorial representation of the tangent space at a point, x, on a sphere. This vector space can be thought of as a subspace of R^{3} itself. Then vectors in it would be called geometrical tangent vectors. By the same principle, the tangent space at a point in flat spacetime can be thought of as a subspace of spacetime, which happens to be all of spacetime.

In practice, one need not be concerned with the tangent spaces. The vector space structure of Minkowski spacetime allows for the canonical identification of vectors in tangent spaces at points (events) with vectors (points, events) in Minkowski spacetime itself. See e.g. Lee (2003, Proposition 3.8.) or Lee (2012, Proposition 3.13.) These identifications are routinely done in mathematics. They can be expressed formally in Cartesian coordinates as
$$\begin{align}
\left(x^0,\, x^1,\, x^2,\, x^3\right)
\ &\leftrightarrow\ \left. x^0 \mathbf e_0 \right|_p + \left. x^1 \mathbf e_1 \right|_p + \left. x^2 \mathbf e_2 \right|_p + \left. x^3 \mathbf e_3 \right|_p \\
&\leftrightarrow\ \left. x^0 \mathbf e_0 \right|_q + \left. x^1 \mathbf e_1 \right|_q + \left. x^2 \mathbf e_2 \right|_q + \left. x^3 \mathbf e_3 \right|_q
\end{align}$$
with basis vectors in the tangent spaces defined by
$$\left.\mathbf e_\mu\right|_p = \left.\frac{\partial}{\partial x^\mu}\right|_p \text{ or }
\mathbf e_0|_p = \left(\begin{matrix} 1 \\ 0 \\ 0  \\ 0\end{matrix}\right) \text{, etc}.$$

Here, p and q are any two events, and the second basis vector identification is referred to as parallel transport. The first identification is the canonical identification of vectors in the tangent space at any point with vectors in the space itself. The appearance of basis vectors in tangent spaces as first-order differential operators is due to this identification. It is motivated by the observation that a geometrical tangent vector can be associated in a one-to-one manner with a directional derivative operator on the set of smooth functions. This is promoted to a definition of tangent vectors in manifolds not necessarily being embedded in R^{n}. This definition of tangent vectors is not the only possible one, as ordinary n-tuples can be used as well.

Definitions of tangent vectors as ordinary vectors

A tangent vector at a point p may be defined, here specialized to Cartesian coordinates in Lorentz frames, as 4 × 1 column vectors v associated to each Lorentz frame related by Lorentz transformation Λ such that the vector v in a frame related to some frame by Λ transforms according to v → Λv. This is the same way in which the coordinates x^{μ} transform. Explicitly,
$$\begin{align}
x'^\mu &= {\Lambda^\mu}_\nu x^\nu, \\
v'^\mu &= {\Lambda^\mu}_\nu v^\nu.
\end{align}$$

This definition is equivalent to the definition given above under a canonical isomorphism.

For some purposes, it is desirable to identify tangent vectors at a point p with displacement vectors at p, which is, of course, admissible by essentially the same canonical identification. The identifications of vectors referred to above in the mathematical setting can correspondingly be found in a more physical and explicitly geometrical setting in Misner, Thorne & Wheeler (1973). They offer various degrees of sophistication (and rigor) depending on which part of the material one chooses to read.

=== Metric signature ===
The metric signature refers to which sign the Minkowski inner product yields when given space (spacelike to be specific, defined further down) and time basis vectors (timelike) as arguments. Further discussion about this theoretically inconsequential but practically necessary choice for purposes of internal consistency and convenience is deferred to the hide box below. See also the page treating sign convention in Relativity.

The choice of metric signature

In general, but with several exceptions, mathematicians and general relativists prefer spacelike vectors to yield a positive sign, (− + + +), while particle physicists tend to prefer timelike vectors to yield a positive sign, (+ − − −). Authors covering several areas of physics, e.g. Steven Weinberg and Landau and Lifshitz ((− + + +) and (+ − − −), respectively) stick to one choice regardless of topic. Arguments for the former convention include "continuity" from the Euclidean case corresponding to the non-relativistic limit c → ∞. Arguments for the latter include that minus signs, otherwise ubiquitous in particle physics, go away. Yet other authors, especially of introductory texts, e.g. Kleppner & Kolenkow (1978), do not choose a signature at all, but instead, opt to coordinatize spacetime such that the time coordinate (but not time itself!) is imaginary. This removes the need for the explicit introduction of a metric tensor (which may seem like an extra burden in an introductory course), and one need not be concerned with covariant vectors and contravariant vectors (or raising and lowering indices) to be described below. The inner product is instead effected by a straightforward extension of the dot product from $\mathbb{R}^3$ over to $\mathbb{C} \times \mathbb{R}^3.$ This works in the flat spacetime of special relativity, but not in the curved spacetime of general relativity, see Misner, Thorne & Wheeler (1973, Box 2.1, "Farewell to i c t ") (who, by the way use (− + + +) ). MTW also argues that it hides the true indefinite nature of the metric and the true nature of Lorentz boosts, which are not rotations. It also needlessly complicates the use of tools of differential geometry that are otherwise immediately available and useful for geometrical description and calculation – even in the flat spacetime of special relativity, e.g. of the electromagnetic field.

=== Terminology ===
Mathematically associated with the bilinear form is a tensor of type (0,2) at each point in spacetime, called the Minkowski metric. (Note: For comparison and motivation of terminology, take a Riemannian metric, which provides a positive definite symmetric bilinear form, i. e. an inner product proper at each point on a manifold.) The Minkowski metric, the bilinear form, and the Minkowski inner product are all the same object; it is a bilinear function that accepts two (contravariant) vectors and returns a real number. In coordinates, this is the 4×4 matrix representing the bilinear form.

For comparison, in general relativity, a Lorentzian manifold L is likewise equipped with a metric tensor g, which is a nondegenerate symmetric bilinear form on the tangent space T_{p}L at each point p of L. In coordinates, it may be represented by a 4×4 matrix depending on spacetime position. Minkowski spacetime is thus a comparatively simple special case of a Lorentzian manifold. Its metric tensor is in coordinates with the same symmetric matrix at every point of M, and its arguments can, per above, be taken as vectors in spacetime itself.

Introducing more terminology (but not more structure), Minkowski spacetime is thus a pseudo-Euclidean space with total dimension n = 4 and signature (1, 3) or (3, 1). Elements of Minkowski spacetime are called events. Minkowski spacetime is often denoted R^{1,3} or R^{3,1} to emphasize the chosen signature, or just M. It is an example of a pseudo-Riemannian manifold.

Then mathematically, the metric is a bilinear form on an abstract four-dimensional real vector space V, that is,
$$\eta:V\times V\rightarrow \mathbf{R}$$
where η has signature (+, -, -, -), and signature is a coordinate-invariant property of η. The space of bilinear maps forms a vector space which can be identified with $M^*\otimes M^*$, and η may be equivalently viewed as an element of this space. By making a choice of orthonormal basis $\{e_\mu\}$, $M:=(V,\eta)$ can be identified with the space $\mathbf{R}^{1,3}:=(\mathbf{R}^{4},\eta_{\mu\nu})$. The notation is meant to emphasize the fact that M and $\mathbf{R}^{1,3}$ are not just vector spaces but have added structure. $\eta_{\mu\nu} = \text{diag}(+1, -1, -1, -1)$.

An interesting example of non-inertial coordinates for (part of) Minkowski spacetime is the Born coordinates. Another useful set of coordinates is the light-cone coordinates.

=== Pseudo-Euclidean metrics ===
The Minkowski inner product is not an inner product, since it has non-zero null vectors. Since it is not a definite bilinear form it is called indefinite.

The Minkowski metric η is the metric tensor of Minkowski spacetime. It is a pseudo-Euclidean metric, or more generally, a constant pseudo-Riemannian metric in Cartesian coordinates. As such, it is a nondegenerate symmetric bilinear form, a type (0, 2) tensor. It accepts two arguments u_{p}, v_{p}, vectors in T_{p}M, p ∈ M, the tangent space at p in M. Due to the above-mentioned canonical identification of T_{p}M with M itself, it accepts arguments u, v with both u and v in M.

As a notational convention, vectors v in M, called 4-vectors, are denoted in italics, and not, as is common in the Euclidean setting, with boldface v. The latter is generally reserved for the 3-vector part (to be introduced below) of a 4-vector.

The definition
$$u \cdot v = \eta(u,\, v)$$
yields an inner product-like structure on M, previously and also henceforth, called the Minkowski inner product, similar to the Euclidean inner product, but it describes a different geometry. It is also called the relativistic dot product. If the two arguments are the same,
$$u \cdot u = \eta(u, u) \equiv \|u\|^2 \equiv u^2,$$
the resulting quantity will be called the Minkowski norm squared. The Minkowski inner product satisfies the following properties.

Linearity in the first argument
$$\eta(au + v,\, w) = a\eta(u,\, w) + \eta(v,\, w),\quad \forall u,\, v \in M,\; \forall a \in \R$$
Symmetry
$$\eta(u,\, v) = \eta(v,\, u)$$
Non-degeneracy
$$\eta(u,\, v) = 0,\; \forall v \in M\  \Rightarrow\  u = 0$$

The first two conditions imply bilinearity.

The most important feature of the inner product and norm squared is that these are quantities unaffected by Lorentz transformations. In fact, it can be taken as the defining property of a Lorentz transformation in that it preserves the inner product (i.e. the value of the corresponding bilinear form on two vectors). This approach is taken more generally for all classical groups definable this way in classical group. There, the matrix Φ is identical in the case O(3, 1) (the Lorentz group) to the matrix η to be displayed below.

=== Orthogonality ===
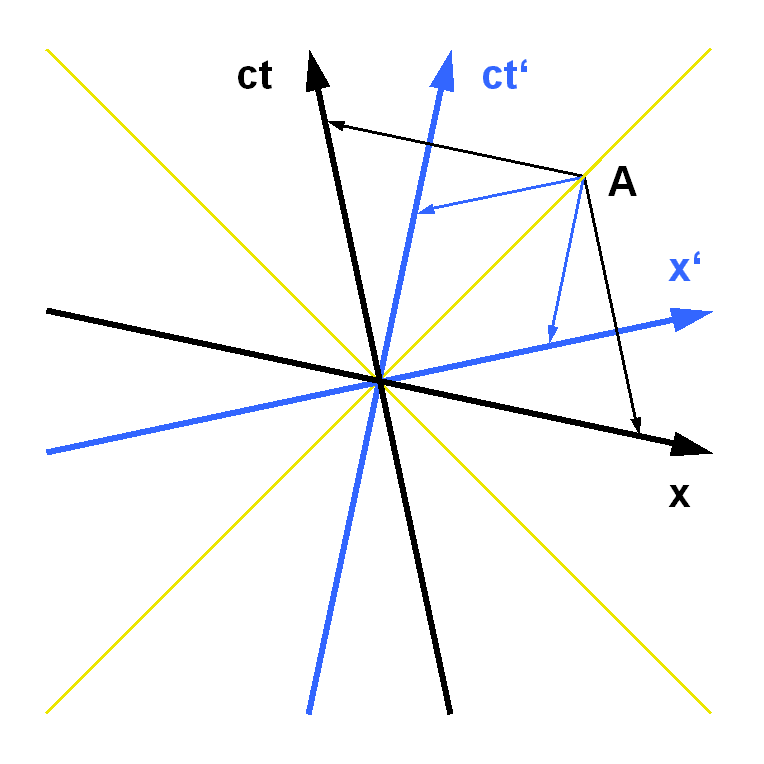
Both black and blue axes are hyperbolically orthogonal; ratio of space to time is constant for light speed.

Minkowski spacetime is constructed so that the speed of light will be the same constant regardless of the reference frame in which it is measured. This property results from the relation of the time axis to a space axis. Two events u and v are orthogonal when the bilinear form is zero for them: η(v, w) = 0.

When both u and v are both space-like, then they are perpendicular, but if one is time-like and the other space-like, then the relation is hyperbolic orthogonality. The relation is preserved in a change of reference frames and consequently the computation of light speed yields a constant result. The change of reference frame is called a Lorentz boost and in mathematics it is a hyperbolic rotation. Each reference frame is associated with a hyperbolic angle, which is zero for the rest frame in Minkowski spacetime. Such a hyperbolic angle has been labelled rapidity since it is associated with the speed of the frame.

=== Minkowski metric ===
From the second postulate of special relativity, together with homogeneity of spacetime and isotropy of space, it follows that the spacetime interval between two arbitrary events called 1 and 2 is:
$$c^2\left(t_1 - t_2\right)^2 - \left(x_1 - x_2\right)^2 - \left(y_1 - y_2\right)^2 - \left(z_1 - z_2\right)^2.$$
This quantity is not consistently named in the literature. The interval is sometimes referred to as the square root of the interval as defined here.

The invariance of the interval under coordinate transformations between inertial frames follows from the invariance of
$$c^2 t^2 - x^2 - y^2 - z^2$$
provided the transformations are linear. This quadratic form can be used to define a bilinear form
$$u \cdot v = c^2 t_1 t_2 - x_1 x_2 - y_1 y_2 - z_1 z_2$$
via the polarization identity. This bilinear form can in turn be written as
$$u \cdot v =  u^\textsf{T} \, [\eta] \, v,$$
where [η] is a $4\times 4$ matrix associated with η. While possibly confusing, it is common practice to denote [η] with just η. The matrix is read off from the explicit bilinear form as
$$\eta = \left(\begin{array}{r}
1 &  0 &  0 &  0 \\
0 & -1 &  0 &  0 \\
0 &  0 & -1 &  0 \\
0 &  0 &  0 & -1
\end{array}\right)\!,$$
and the bilinear form
$$u \cdot v = \eta(u, v),$$
with which this section started by assuming its existence, is now identified.

For definiteness and shorter presentation, the signature (− + + +) is adopted below. This choice (or the other possible choice) has no (known) physical implications. The symmetry group preserving the bilinear form with one choice of signature is isomorphic (under the map given here) with the symmetry group preserving the other choice of signature. This means that both choices are in accord with the two postulates of relativity. Switching between the two conventions is straightforward. If the metric tensor η has been used in a derivation, go back to the earliest point where it was used, substitute η for −η, and retrace forward to the desired formula with the desired metric signature.

=== Standard basis ===
A standard or orthonormal basis for Minkowski spacetime is a set of four mutually orthogonal vectors {e_{0}, e_{1}, e_{2}, e_{3}} such that
$$\eta(e_0, e_0) = -\eta(e_1, e_1) = -\eta(e_2, e_2) = -\eta(e_3, e_3) = 1$$
and for which
$$\eta(e_\mu, e_\nu) = 0$$
when $\mu \neq \nu\,.$

These conditions can be written compactly in the form
$$\eta(e_\mu, e_\nu) = \eta_{\mu \nu}.$$

Relative to a standard basis, the components of a vector v are written (v^{0}, v^{1}, v^{2}, v^{3}) where the Einstein notation is used to write v = v^{μ} e_{μ}. The component v^{0} is called the timelike component of v while the other three components are called the spatial components. The spatial components of a 4-vector v may be identified with a 3-vector v = (v_{1}, v_{2}, v_{3}).

In terms of components, the Minkowski inner product between two vectors v and w is given by

$$\eta(v, w) = \eta_{\mu \nu} v^\mu w^\nu = v^0 w_0 + v^1 w_1 + v^2 w_2 + v^3 w_3 = v^\mu w_\mu = v_\mu w^\mu,$$
and
$$\eta(v, v) = \eta_{\mu \nu} v^\mu v^\nu = v^0v_0 + v^1 v_1 + v^2 v_2 + v^3 v_3 = v^\mu v_\mu.$$

Here lowering of an index with the metric was used.

There are many possible choices of standard basis obeying the condition $\eta(e_\mu, e_\nu) = \eta_{\mu \nu}.$ Any two such bases are related in some sense by a Lorentz transformation, either by a change-of-basis matrix $\Lambda^\mu_\nu$, a real 4 × 4 matrix satisfying
$$\Lambda^\mu_\rho\eta_{\mu \nu}\Lambda^\nu_\sigma = \eta_{\rho \sigma}.$$
or Λ, a linear map on the abstract vector space satisfying, for any pair of vectors u, v,
$$\eta(\Lambda u, \Lambda v) = \eta(u, v).$$

Then if two different bases exist, {e_{0}, e_{1}, e_{2}, e_{3}} and {e′_{0}, e′_{1}, e′_{2}, e′_{3}}, $e_\mu' = e_\nu\Lambda^\nu_\mu$ can be represented as $e_\mu' = e_\nu\Lambda^\nu_\mu$ or $e_\mu' = \Lambda e_\mu$. While it might be tempting to think of $\Lambda^\mu_\nu$ and Λ as the same thing, mathematically, they are elements of different spaces, and act on the space of standard bases from different sides.

==== Raising and lowering of indices ====
Linear functionals (1-forms) α, β and their sum σ and vectors u, v, w, in 3d Euclidean space. The number of (1-form) hyperplanes intersected by a vector equals the inner product.

Technically, a non-degenerate bilinear form provides a map between a vector space and its dual; in this context, the map is between the tangent spaces of M and the cotangent spaces of M. At a point in M, the tangent and cotangent spaces are dual vector spaces (so the dimension of the cotangent space at an event is also 4). Just as an authentic inner product on a vector space with one argument fixed, by Riesz representation theorem, may be expressed as the action of a linear functional on the vector space, the same holds for the Minkowski inner product of Minkowski spacetime.

Thus if v^{μ} are the components of a vector in tangent space, then η_{μν} v^{μ} = v_{ν} are the components of a vector in the cotangent space (a linear functional). Due to the identification of vectors in tangent spaces with vectors in M itself, this is mostly ignored, and vectors with lower indices are referred to as covariant vectors. In this latter interpretation, the covariant vectors are (almost always implicitly) identified with vectors (linear functionals) in the dual of Minkowski spacetime. The ones with upper indices are contravariant vectors. In the same fashion, the inverse of the map from tangent to cotangent spaces, explicitly given by the inverse of η in matrix representation, can be used to define raising of an index. The components of this inverse are denoted η^{μν}. It happens that η^{μν} = η_{μν}. These maps between a vector space and its dual can be denoted η^{♭} (eta-flat) and η^{♯} (eta-sharp) by the musical analogy.

Contravariant and covariant vectors are geometrically very different objects. The first can and should be thought of as arrows. A linear function can be characterized by two objects: its kernel, which is a hyperplane passing through the origin, and its norm. Geometrically thus, covariant vectors should be viewed as a set of hyperplanes, with spacing depending on the norm (bigger = smaller spacing), with one of them (the kernel) passing through the origin. The mathematical term for a covariant vector is 1-covector or 1-form (though the latter is usually reserved for covector fields).

One quantum mechanical analogy explored in the literature is that of a de Broglie wave (scaled by a factor of Planck's reduced constant) associated with a momentum four-vector to illustrate how one could imagine a covariant version of a contravariant vector. The inner product of two contravariant vectors could equally well be thought of as the action of the covariant version of one of them on the contravariant version of the other. The inner product is then how many times the arrow pierces the planes. The mathematical reference, Lee (2003), offers the same geometrical view of these objects (but mentions no piercing).

The electromagnetic field tensor is a differential 2-form, which geometrical description can as well be found in MTW.

One may, of course, ignore geometrical views altogether (as is the style in e.g. Weinberg (2002) and Landau & Lifshitz 2002) and proceed algebraically in a purely formal fashion. The time-proven robustness of the formalism itself, sometimes referred to as index gymnastics, ensures that moving vectors around and changing from contravariant to covariant vectors and vice versa (as well as higher order tensors) is mathematically sound. Incorrect expressions tend to reveal themselves quickly.

==== Coordinate free raising and lowering ====
Given a bilinear form $\ \eta : M \times M \rightarrow \mathbb{R}\ ,$ the lowered version of a vector can be thought of as the partial evaluation of $\ \eta\ ,$ that is, there is an associated partial evaluation map
$$\eta(\cdot, -) : M \rightarrow M^*\ ~,\quad v \mapsto \eta(v,\cdot) ~.$$

The lowered vector $\ \eta(v,\cdot) \in M^*\$ is then the dual map $\ u \mapsto \eta(v,u) ~.$ Note it does not matter which argument is partially evaluated due to the symmetry of $\ \eta ~.$

Non-degeneracy is then equivalent to injectivity of the partial evaluation map, or equivalently non-degeneracy indicates that the kernel of the map is trivial. In finite dimension, as is the case here, and noting that the dimension of a finite-dimensional space is equal to the dimension of the dual, this is enough to conclude the partial evaluation map is a linear isomorphism from $\ M\$ to $\ M^* ~.$ This then allows the definition of the inverse partial evaluation map,
$$\eta^{-1} : M^* \rightarrow M\ ,$$
which allows the inverse metric to be defined as
$$\eta^{-1} : M^* \times M^* \rightarrow \mathbb{R}\ ~,\quad \eta^{-1}\!(\alpha,\beta)\ =\ \eta\bigl(\ \eta^{-1}\!(\alpha),\ \eta^{-1}\!(\beta)\ \bigr)\$$
where the two different usages of $\; \eta^{-1}\$ can be told apart by the argument each is evaluated on. This can then be used to raise indices. If a coordinate basis is used, the metric η^{−1} is indeed the matrix inverse to η .

==== Formalism of the Minkowski metric ====
The present purpose is to show semi-rigorously how formally one may apply the Minkowski metric to two vectors and obtain a real number, i.e. to display the role of the differentials and how they disappear in a calculation. The setting is that of smooth manifold theory, and concepts such as convector fields and exterior derivatives are introduced.

A formal approach to the Minkowski metric

A full-blown version of the Minkowski metric in coordinates as a tensor field on spacetime has the appearance
$$\eta_{\mu\nu} \operatorname{d}x^\mu \otimes \operatorname{d}x^\nu = \eta_{\mu\nu} \operatorname{d}x^\mu \odot \operatorname{d}x^\nu = \eta_{\mu\nu} \operatorname{d}x^\mu \operatorname{d}x^\nu ~.$$

Explanation: The coordinate differentials are 1-form fields. They are defined as the exterior derivative of the coordinate functions x^{μ}. These quantities evaluated at a point p provide a basis for the cotangent space at p. The tensor product (denoted by the symbol ⊗) yields a tensor field of type (0, 2), i.e. the type that expects two contravariant vectors as arguments. On the right-hand side, the symmetric product (denoted by the symbol ⊙ or by juxtaposition) has been taken. The equality holds since, by definition, the Minkowski metric is symmetric. The notation on the far right is also sometimes used for the related, but different, line element. It is not a tensor. For elaboration on the differences and similarities, see Misner, Thorne & Wheeler (1973, Box 3.2 and section 13.2.)

Tangent vectors are, in this formalism, given in terms of a basis of differential operators of the first order,
$$\left.\frac{\partial}{\partial x^\mu}\right|_p\ ,$$
where p is an event. This operator applied to a function f gives the directional derivative of f at p in the direction of increasing x^{μ} with x^{ν}, ν ≠ μ fixed. They provide a basis for the tangent space at p.

The exterior derivative df of a function f is a covector field, i.e. an assignment of a cotangent vector to each point p, by definition such that
$$\operatorname{d}f(X) = X\ f,$$
for each vector field X. A vector field is an assignment of a tangent vector to each point p. In coordinates X can be expanded at each point p in the basis given by the ∂/∂x^{ν} | _{p} . Applying this with f = x^{μ}, the coordinate function itself, and X = ∂/ ∂x^{ν} , called a coordinate vector field, one obtains
$$\operatorname{d}x^\mu\left(\frac{\partial}{\partial x^\nu}\right) = \frac{\partial x^\mu}{\partial x^\nu} = \delta_\nu^\mu ~.$$

Since this relation holds at each point p, the dx^{μ}|_{p} provide a basis for the cotangent space at each p and the bases d x^{μ}|_{p} and ∂/∂x^{ν} |_{p} are dual to each other,
$$\Bigl.\operatorname{d}x^\mu \Bigr|_p \left(\left.\frac{\partial}{\partial x^\nu}\right|_p\right) = \delta^\mu_\nu ~.$$
at each p. Furthermore, one has
$$\alpha\ \otimes\ \beta(a, b)\ =\ \alpha(a)\ \beta(b)\$$
for general one-forms on a tangent space α, β and general tangent vectors a, b. (This can be taken as a definition, but may also be proved in a more general setting.)

Thus when the metric tensor is fed two vectors fields a, b, both expanded in terms of the basis coordinate vector fields, the result is
$$\eta_{\mu\nu}\ \operatorname{d}x^\mu \otimes \operatorname{d}x^\nu(a, b)\ =\ \eta_{\mu\nu}\ a^\mu\ b^\nu\ ,$$
where a^{μ}, b^{ν} are the component functions of the vector fields. The above equation holds at each point p, and the relation may as well be interpreted as the Minkowski metric at p applied to two tangent vectors at p.

As mentioned, in a vector space, such as modeling the spacetime of special relativity, tangent vectors can be canonically identified with vectors in the space itself, and vice versa. This means that the tangent spaces at each point are canonically identified with each other and with the vector space itself. This explains how the right-hand side of the above equation can be employed directly, without regard to the spacetime point the metric is to be evaluated and from where (which tangent space) the vectors come from.

This situation changes in general relativity. There one has
$$g_{\mu\nu}\!(p)\ \Bigl.\operatorname{d}x^\mu \Bigr|_p\ \left. \operatorname{d}x^\nu \right|_p(a, b)\ =\ g_{\mu\nu}\!(p)\ a^\mu\ b^\nu\ ,$$
where now η → g(p), i.e., g is still a metric tensor but now depending on spacetime and is a solution of Einstein's field equations. Moreover, a, b must be tangent vectors at spacetime point p and can no longer be moved around freely.

=== Chronological and causality relations ===
Let x, y ∈ M. Here,

1. x **chronologically precedes** y if y − x is future-directed timelike. This relation has the transitive property and so can be written x < y.
2. x **causally precedes** y if y − x is future-directed null or future-directed timelike. It gives a partial ordering of spacetime and so can be written x ≤ y.

Suppose x ∈ M is timelike. Then the simultaneous hyperplane for x is {y : η(x, y) = 0}. Since this hyperplane varies as x varies, there is a relativity of simultaneity in Minkowski spacetime.

== Generalizations ==
A Lorentzian manifold is a generalization of Minkowski spacetime in two ways. The total number of spacetime dimensions is not restricted to be 4 (2 or more) and a Lorentzian manifold need not be flat, i.e. it allows for curvature.

=== Complexified Minkowski spacetime ===
Complexified Minkowski spacetime is defined as M_{c} = M ⊕ iM. Its real part is the Minkowski spacetime of four-vectors, such as the four-velocity and the four-momentum, which are independent of the choice of orientation of the space. The imaginary part, on the other hand, may consist of four pseudovectors, such as angular velocity and magnetic moment, which change their direction with a change of orientation. A pseudoscalar i is introduced, which also changes sign with a change of orientation. Thus, elements of M_{c} are independent of the choice of the orientation.

The inner product-like structure on M_{c} is defined as u ⋅ v = η(u, v) for any u,v ∈ M_{c}. A relativistic pure spin of an electron or any half spin particle is described by ρ ∈ M_{c} as ρ = u + is, where u is the four-velocity of the particle, satisfying u^{2} = 1 and s is the 4D spin vector, which is also the Pauli–Lubanski pseudovector satisfying s^{2} = −1 and u ⋅ s = 0.

=== Generalized Minkowski spacetime ===
Minkowski spacetime refers to a matimethematical formulation in four dimensions. However, the mathematics can easily be extended or simplified to create an analogous generalized Minkowski spacetime in any number of dimensions. If n ≥ 2, n-dimensional Minkowski spacetime is a vector space of real dimension n on which there is a constant Minkowski metric of signature (n − 1, 1) or (1, n − 1). These generalizations are used in theories where spacetime is assumed to have more or less than 4 dimensions. String theory and M-theory are two examples where n > 4. In string theory there appear conformal field theories with 1 + 1 spacetime dimensions.

de Sitter space can be formulated as a submanifold of generalized Minkowski spacetime as can the model spaces of hyperbolic geometry (see below).

=== Curvature ===
As a flat spacetime, the three spatial components of Minkowski spacetime always obey the Pythagorean theorem. Minkowski spacetime is a suitable basis for special relativity, a good description of physical systems over finite distances in systems without significant gravitation. However, in order to take gravity into account, physicists use the theory of general relativity, which is formulated in the mathematics of differential geometry of differential manifolds. When this geometry is used as a model of spacetime, it is known as curved spacetime.

Even in curved spacetime, Minkowski spacetime is still a good description in an infinitesimal region surrounding any point (barring gravitational singularities). (Note: This similarity between flat space and curved space at infinitesimally small distance scales is foundational to the definition of a manifold in general.) More abstractly, it can be said that in the presence of gravity spacetime is described by a curved 4-dimensional manifold for which the tangent space to any point is a 4-dimensional Minkowski spacetime. Thus, the structure of Minkowski spacetime is still essential in the description of general relativity.

== Geometry ==
The meaning of the term geometry for the Minkowski spacetime depends heavily on the context. Minkowski spacetime is not endowed with Euclidean geometry, and not with any of the generalized Riemannian geometries with intrinsic curvature, those exposed by the model spaces in hyperbolic geometry (negative curvature) and the geometry modeled by the sphere (positive curvature). The reason is the indefiniteness of the Minkowski metric. Minkowski spacetime is, in particular, not a metric space and not a Riemannian manifold with a Riemannian metric. However, Minkowski spacetime contains submanifolds endowed with a Riemannian metric yielding hyperbolic geometry.

Model spaces of hyperbolic geometry of low dimension, say 2 or 3, cannot be isometrically embedded in Euclidean space with one more dimension, i.e. $\mathbb{R}^3$ or $\mathbb{R}^4$ respectively, with the Euclidean metric $\overline{g}$, preventing easy visualization. (Note: There is an isometric embedding into $\mathbb{R}^n$ according to the Nash embedding theorem (Nash (1956)), but the embedding dimension is much higher, n = (m/2)(m + 1)(3m + 11) for a Riemannian manifold of dimension m.) By comparison, model spaces with positive curvature are just spheres in Euclidean space of one higher dimension. Hyperbolic spaces can be isometrically embedded in spaces of one more dimension when the embedding space is endowed with the Minkowski metric $\eta$.

Define $\mathbf{H}^{1(n)}_R \subset \mathbf{M}^{n+1}$to be the upper sheet ($ct > 0$) of the hyperboloid
$$\mathbf H_R^{1(n)} = \left\{\left(ct, x^1, \ldots, x^n\right) \in \mathbf M^n: c^2 t^2 - \left(x^1\right)^2 - \cdots - \left(x^n\right)^2 = R^2, ct > 0\right\}$$
in generalized Minkowski spacetime $\mathbf{M}^{n+1}$ of spacetime dimension $n + 1.$ This is one of the surfaces of transitivity of the generalized Lorentz group. The induced metric on this submanifold,
$$h_R^{1(n)} = \iota^* \eta,$$
the pullback of the Minkowski metric $\eta$ under inclusion, is a Riemannian metric. With this metric $\mathbf{H}^{1(n)}_R$ is a Riemannian manifold. It is one of the model spaces of Riemannian geometry, the hyperboloid model of hyperbolic space. It is a space of constant negative curvature $-1/R^2$. The 1 in the upper index refers to an enumeration of the different model spaces of hyperbolic geometry, and the n for its dimension. A $2(2)$ corresponds to the Poincaré disk model, while $3(n)$ corresponds to the Poincaré half-space model of dimension $n.$

=== Preliminaries ===
In the definition above $\iota: \mathbf{H}^{1(n)}_R \rightarrow \mathbf{M}^{n+1}$ is the inclusion map and the superscript star denotes the pullback. The present purpose is to describe this and similar operations as a preparation for the actual demonstration that $\mathbf{H}^{1(n)}_R$ actually is a hyperbolic space.

Behavior of tensors under inclusion, pullback of covariant tensors under general maps and pushforward of vectors under general maps

Behavior of tensors under inclusion:
For inclusion maps from a submanifold S into M and a covariant tensor α of order k on M it holds that
$$\iota^*\alpha\left(X_1,\, X_2,\, \ldots,\, X_k\right) = \alpha\left(\iota_* X_1,\, \iota_*X_2,\, \ldots,\, \iota_* X_k\right) = \alpha\left(X_1,\, X_2,\, \ldots,\, X_k\right),$$
where X_{1}, X_{1}, ..., X_{k} are vector fields on S. The subscript star denotes the pushforward (to be introduced later), and it is in this special case simply the identity map (as is the inclusion map). The latter equality holds because a tangent space to a submanifold at a point is in a canonical way a subspace of the tangent space of the manifold itself at the point in question. One may simply write
$$\iota^*\alpha = \alpha|_S,$$
meaning (with slight abuse of notation) the restriction of α to accept as input vectors tangent to some s ∈ S only.

Pullback of tensors under general maps:
The pullback of a covariant k-tensor α (one taking only contravariant vectors as arguments) under a map F: M → N is a linear map
$$F^*\colon T_{F(p)}^k N \rightarrow T_p^k M,$$
where for any vector space V,
$$T^k V = \underbrace{V^* \otimes V^* \otimes \cdots \otimes V^*}_{k\text{ times}}.$$

It is defined by
$$F^*(\alpha)\left(X_1,\, X_2,\, \ldots,\, X_k\right) = \alpha\left(F_* X_1,\, F_*X_2,\, \ldots,\, F_* X_k\right),$$
where the subscript star denotes the pushforward of the map F, and X^{1}, X^{2}, ..., X^{k} are vectors in T_{p}M. (This is in accord with what was detailed about the pullback of the inclusion map. In the general case here, one cannot proceed as simply because F_{∗}X_{1} ≠ X_{1} in general.)

The pushforward of vectors under general maps:
Heuristically, pulling back a tensor to p ∈ M from F(p) ∈ N feeding it vectors residing at p ∈ M is by definition the same as pushing forward the vectors from p ∈ M to F(p) ∈ N feeding them to the tensor residing at F(p) ∈ N.

Further unwinding the definitions, the pushforward F_{∗}: TM_{p} → TN_{F(p)} of a vector field under a map F: M → N between manifolds is defined by
$$F_*(X)f = X(f \circ F),$$
where f is a function on N. When M = R^{m}, N= R^{n} the pushforward of F reduces to DF: R^{m} → R^{n}, the ordinary differential, which is given by the Jacobian matrix of partial derivatives of the component functions. The differential is the best linear approximation of a function F from R^{m} to R^{n}. The pushforward is the smooth manifold version of this. It acts between tangent spaces, and is in coordinates represented by the Jacobian matrix of the coordinate representation of the function.

The corresponding pullback is the dual map from the dual of the range tangent space to the dual of the domain tangent space, i.e. it is a linear map,
$$F^*\colon T^*_{F(p)}N \rightarrow T^*_p M.$$

=== Hyperbolic stereographic projection ===
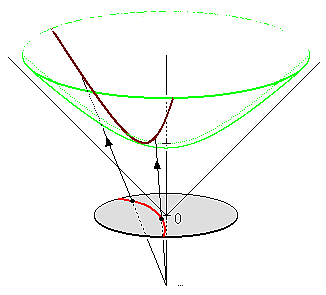
Red circular arc is geodesic in Poincaré disk model; it projects to the brown geodesic on the green hyperboloid.

In order to exhibit the metric, it is necessary to pull it back via a suitable parametrization. A parametrization of a submanifold S of a manifold M is a map U ⊂ R^{m} → M whose range is an open subset of S. If S has the same dimension as M, a parametrization is just the inverse of a coordinate map φ: M → U ⊂ R^{m}. The parametrization to be used is the inverse of hyperbolic stereographic projection. This is illustrated in the figure to the right for n = 2. It is instructive to compare to stereographic projection for spheres.

Stereographic projection σ: H^{n}_{R} → R^{n} and its inverse σ^{−1}: R^{n} → H^{n}_{R} are given by
$$\begin{align}
\sigma(\tau, \mathbf x) = \mathbf u &= \frac{R\mathbf x}{R + \tau},\\
\sigma^{-1}(\mathbf u) = (\tau, \mathbf x) &= \left(R\frac{R^2 + |u|^2}{R^2 - |u|^2}, \frac{2R^2\mathbf u}{R^2 - |u|^2}\right),
\end{align}$$
where, for simplicity, τ ≡ ct. The (τ, x) are coordinates on M^{n+1} and the u are coordinates on R^{n}.

Detailed derivation

Let
$$\mathbf H_R^n = \left\{\left(\tau, x^1, \ldots, x^n\right) \subset \mathbf M: -\tau^2 + \left(x^1\right)^2 + \cdots + \left(x^n\right)^2 = -R^2, \tau > 0\right\}$$
and let
$$S = (-R, 0, \ldots, 0) .$$

If
$$P = \left(\tau, x^1, \ldots, x^n\right) \in \mathbf H_R^n,$$
then it is geometrically clear that the vector
$$\overrightarrow{PS}$$
intersects the hyperplane
$$\left\{\left(\tau, x^1, \ldots, x^n\right) \in M: \tau = 0\right\}$$
once in point denoted
$$U = \left(0, u^1(P), \ldots, u^n(P)\right) \equiv (0, \mathbf u).$$

One has
$$\begin{align}
S + \overrightarrow{SU} &= U \Rightarrow \overrightarrow{SU} = U - S,\\
S + \overrightarrow{SP} &= P \Rightarrow \overrightarrow{SP} = P - S
\end{align}$$
or
$$\begin{align}
\overrightarrow{SU} &= (0, \mathbf u) - (-R,\mathbf 0) = (R, \mathbf u),\\
\overrightarrow{SP} &= (\tau, \mathbf x) - (-R,\mathbf 0) = (\tau + R, \mathbf x).
\end{align}.$$

By construction of stereographic projection one has
$$\overrightarrow{SU} = \lambda(\tau)\overrightarrow{SP}.$$

This leads to the system of equations
$$\begin{align}
R &= \lambda(\tau + R),\\
\mathbf u &= \lambda \mathbf x.
\end{align}$$

The first of these is solved for λ and one obtains for stereographic projection
$$\sigma(\tau, \mathbf x) = \mathbf u = \frac{R\mathbf x}{R + \tau}.$$

Next, the inverse σ^{−1}(u) = (τ, x) must be calculated. Use the same considerations as before, but now with
$$\begin{align}
U &= (0, \mathbf u)\\
P &= (\tau(\mathbf u), \mathbf x(\mathbf u)).
\end{align} ,$$
one gets
$$\begin{align}
\tau &= \frac{R(1 - \lambda)}{\lambda},\\
\mathbf x &= \frac{\mathbf u}{\lambda},
\end{align}$$
but now with λ depending on u. The condition for P lying in the hyperboloid is
$$-\tau^2 + |\mathbf x|^2 = -R^2,$$
or
$$-\frac{R^2(1 - \lambda)^2}{\lambda^2}+\frac{|\mathbf u|^2}{\lambda^2}=-R^2,$$
leading to
$$\lambda = \frac{R^2 - |u|^2}{2R^2}.$$

With this λ, one obtains
$$\sigma^{-1}(\mathbf u) = (\tau, \mathbf x) = \left(R\frac{R^2 + |u|^2}{R^2 - |u|^2}, \frac{2R^2\mathbf u}{R^2 - |u|^2}\right).$$

=== Pulling back the metric ===
One has
$$h_R^{1(n)} = \eta|_{\mathbf H_R^{1(n)}} = \left(dx^1\right)^2 + \cdots + \left(dx^n\right)^2 - d\tau^2$$
and the map
$$\sigma^{-1}:\mathbf{R}^n \rightarrow \mathbf{H}_R^{1(n)};\quad
\sigma^{-1}(\mathbf{u}) = (\tau(\mathbf{u}),\, \mathbf{x}(\mathbf{u})) = \left(R\frac{R^2 + |u|^2}{R^2 - |u|^2},\, \frac{2R^2\mathbf{u}}{R^2 - |u|^2}\right).$$

The pulled back metric can be obtained by straightforward methods of calculus;
$$\left.\left(\sigma^{-1}\right)^* \eta\right|_{\mathbf H_R^{1(n)}} =
\left(dx^1(\mathbf u)\right)^2 + \cdots + \left(dx^n(\mathbf u)\right)^2 - \left(d\tau(\mathbf u)\right)^2.$$

One computes according to the standard rules for computing differentials (though one is really computing the rigorously defined exterior derivatives),
$$\begin{align}
dx^1(\mathbf u) &= d\left(\frac{2R^2 u^1}{R^2 - |u|^2}\right)
= \frac{\partial}{\partial u^1}\frac{2R^2 u^1}{R^2 - |u|^2}du^1 + \cdots +
\frac{\partial}{\partial u^n}\frac{2R^2 u^1}{R^2 - |u|^2}du^n +
\frac{\partial}{\partial\tau}\frac{2R^2 u^1}{R^2 - |u|^2}d\tau,\\
&\ \ \vdots\\
dx^n(\mathbf u) &= d\left(\frac{2R^2 u^n}{R^2 - |u|^2}\right) = \cdots,\\
d\tau(\mathbf u) &= d\left(R\frac{R^2 + |u|^2}{R^2 - |u|^2}\right) = \cdots,
\end{align}$$
and substitutes the results into the right hand side. This yields
$$\left(\sigma^{-1}\right)^* h_R^{1(n)} =
\frac{4R^2 \left[\left(du^1\right)^2 + \cdots + \left(du^n\right)^2\right]}{\left(R^2 - |u|^2\right)^2} \equiv
h_R^{2(n)}.$$

Detailed outline of computation

One has
$$\begin{align}
\frac{\partial}{\partial u^1}\frac{2R^2 u^1}{R^2 - |u|^2}du^1 &= \frac{2\left(R^2 -|u|^2\right) + 4R^2 \left(u^1\right)^2}{\left(R^2 - |u|^2\right)^2}du^1, \\
\frac{\partial}{\partial u^2}\frac{2R^2 u^1}{R^2 - |u|^2}du^2 &= \frac{4R^2 u^1 u^2}{\left(R^2 - |u|^2\right)^2}du^2,
\end{align}$$
and
$$\frac{\partial}{\partial \tau}\frac{2R^2 u^1}{R^2 - |u|^2}d\tau^2 = 0.$$

With this one may write
$$dx^1(\mathbf u) = \frac{2R^2 \left(R^2 - |u|^2\right)du^1 + 4R^2 u^1(\mathbf u \cdot d\mathbf u)}{\left(R^2 - |u|^2\right)^2},$$
from which
$$\left(dx^1(\mathbf{u})\right)^2 =
\frac{4R^2 \left(r^2 - |u|^2\right)^2 \left(du^1\right)^2 +
16R^4 \left(R^2 - |u|^2\right) \left(\mathbf{u} \cdot d\mathbf{u}\right) u^1 du^1 +
16R^4 \left(u^1\right)^2 \left(\mathbf{u} \cdot d\mathbf{u}\right)^2}
{\left(R^2 - |u|^2\right)^4}.$$

Summing this formula one obtains
$$\begin{align}
&\left(dx^1(\mathbf u)\right)^2 + \cdots + \left(dx^n(\mathbf u)\right)^2 \\
={} &\frac{4R^2 \left(R^2 - |u|^2\right)^2 \left[\left(du^1\right)^2 + \cdots + \left(du^n\right)^2\right] +
16R^4 \left(R^2 - |u|^2\right)(\mathbf u \cdot d\mathbf u)(\mathbf u \cdot d\mathbf u) +
16R^4 |u|^2 (\mathbf u \cdot d\mathbf u)^2}
{\left(R^2 - |u|^2\right)^4} \\
={} &\frac{4R^2 \left(R^2 - |u|^2\right)^2 \left[\left(du^1\right)^2 + \cdots + \left(du^n\right)^2\right]}{\left(R^2 - |u|^2\right)^4} +
R^2 \frac{16R^4 (\mathbf u \cdot d\mathbf u)}{\left(R^2 - |u|^2\right)^4}.
\end{align}$$

Similarly, for τ one gets
$$d\tau = \sum_{i=1}^n \frac{\partial}{\partial u^i} R\frac{R^2 + |u|^2}{R^2 + |u|^2}du^i + \frac{\partial}{\partial\tau}R\frac{R^2 + |u|^2}{R^2 + |u|^2}d\tau
= \sum_{i=1}^n R^4\frac{4R^2 u^idu^i}{\left(R^2 - |u|^2\right)},$$
yielding
$$-d\tau^2 = -\left(R\frac{4R^4\left(\mathbf u \cdot d\mathbf u\right)}{\left(R^2 - |u|^2\right)^2}\right)^2
= -R^2\frac{16R^4(\mathbf u \cdot d\mathbf u)^2}{\left(R^2 - |u|^2\right)^4}.$$

Now add this contribution to finally get
$$\left(\sigma^{-1}\right)^* h_R^{1(n)} = \frac{4R^2\left[\left(du^1\right)^2 + \cdots + \left(du^n\right)^2\right]}{\left(R^2 - |u|^2\right)^2} \equiv h_R^{2(n)}.$$

This last equation shows that the metric on the ball is identical to the Riemannian metric h^{2(n)}_{R} in the Poincaré ball model, another standard model of hyperbolic geometry.

Alternative calculation using the pushforward

The pullback can be computed in a different fashion. By definition,
$$\left(\sigma^{-1}\right)^* h_R^{1(n)}(V,\, V) =
h_R^{1(n)}\left(\left(\sigma^{-1}\right)_* V,\, \left(\sigma^{-1}\right)_* V\right) =
\eta|_{\mathbf H_R^{1(n)}} \left(\left(\sigma^{-1}\right)_* V,\, \left(\sigma^{-1}\right)_* V\right).$$

In coordinates,
$$\left(\sigma^{-1}\right)_* V
= \left(\sigma^{-1}\right)_* V^i\frac{\partial}{\partial u^i}
= V^i\frac{\partial x^j}{\partial u^i}\frac{\partial}{\partial x^j} +
V^i\frac{\partial\tau}{\partial u^i}\frac{\partial}{\partial\tau}
= V^i\frac{\partial}x^j{\partial u^i}\frac{\partial}{\partial x^j} +
V^i\frac{\partial}\tau{\partial u^i}\frac{\partial}{\partial\tau}
= Vx^j\frac{\partial}{\partial x^j} + V\tau\frac{\partial}{\partial\tau}.$$

One has from the formula for σ^{–1}
$$\begin{align}
Vx^j &= V^i\frac{\partial}{\partial u^i}\left(\frac{2R^2 u^j}{R^2 - |u|^2}\right)
= \frac{2R^2 V^j}{R^2 - |u|^2} - \frac{4R^2 u^j\langle\mathbf{V},\, \mathbf{u}\rangle}{\left(R^2 - |u|^2\right)^2},\quad
\left(\text{here } V|u|^2 = 2\sum_{k=1}^n V^k u^k \equiv 2\langle\mathbf{V},\, \mathbf{u}\rangle\right) \\
V\tau &= V\left(R\frac{R^2 + |u|^2}{R^2 - |u|^2}\right)
= \frac{4R^3\langle\mathbf{V},\, \mathbf{u}\rangle}{\left(R^2 - |u|^2\right)^2}.
\end{align}$$

Lastly,
$$\eta\left(\sigma_*^{-1}V,\, \sigma_*^{-1}V\right) =
\sum_{j=1}^n\left(Vx^j\right)^2 - (V\tau)^2 =
\frac{4R^4 |V|^2}{\left(R^2 - |u|^2\right)^2} =
h_R^{2(n)}(V,z, V),$$
and the same conclusion is reached.

== See also ==
- Hyperbolic quaternion
- Hyperspace
- Introduction to the mathematics of general relativity
- Minkowski plane
