= Witt equivalence =

In mathematics, Witt equivalence is either of two concepts in the theory of quadratic spaces:

- For fields: having isomorphic Witt rings
- For quadratic forms: having isomorphic core forms in a Witt decomposition
