= Witt's theorem =

Basic result in the algebraic theory of quadratic forms, on extending isometries

"Witt's theorem" or "the Witt theorem" may also refer to the Bourbaki–Witt fixed point theorem of order theory.

In mathematics, Witt's theorem, named after Ernst Witt, is a basic result in the algebraic theory of quadratic forms: any isometry between two subspaces of a nonsingular quadratic space over a field k may be extended to an isometry of the whole space. An analogous statement holds also for skew-symmetric, Hermitian and skew-Hermitian bilinear forms over arbitrary fields. The theorem applies to classification of quadratic forms over k and in particular allows one to define the Witt group W(k) which describes the "stable" theory of quadratic forms over the field k.

== Statement ==
Let (V, b) be a finite-dimensional vector space over a field k of characteristic different from 2 together with a non-degenerate symmetric or skew-symmetric bilinear form. If f : U → U' is an isometry between two subspaces of V then f extends to an isometry of V.

Witt's theorem implies that the dimension of a maximal totally isotropic subspace (null space) of V is an invariant, called the index or Witt index of b, and moreover, that the isometry group of (V, b) acts transitively on the set of maximal isotropic subspaces. This fact plays an important role in the structure theory and representation theory of the isometry group and in the theory of reductive dual pairs.

== Witt's cancellation theorem ==
Let (V, q), (V_{1}, q_{1}), (V_{2}, q_{2}) be three quadratic spaces over a field k. Assume that

$$(V_1,q_1)\oplus(V,q) \simeq (V_2,q_2)\oplus(V,q).$$

Then the quadratic spaces (V_{1}, q_{1}) and (V_{2}, q_{2}) are isometric:

$$(V_1,q_1)\simeq (V_2,q_2).$$

In other words, the direct summand (V, q) appearing in both sides of an isomorphism between quadratic spaces may be "cancelled".

== Witt's decomposition theorem ==
Let (V, q) be a quadratic space over a field k. Then it admits a Witt decomposition:

$$(V,q)\simeq (V_0,0)\oplus(V_a, q_a)\oplus (V_h,q_h),$$

where V_{0} = ker q is the radical of q, (V_{a}, q_{a}) is an anisotropic quadratic space and (V_{h}, q_{h}) is a split quadratic space. Moreover, the anisotropic summand, termed the core form, and the hyperbolic summand in a Witt decomposition of (V, q) are determined uniquely up to isomorphism.

Quadratic forms with the same core form are said to be similar or Witt equivalent.
