= Pseudo-Euclidean space =

Space in mathematics and theoretical physics

In mathematics and theoretical physics, a pseudo-Euclidean space of signature (k, n − k) is a finite-dimensional real n-space together with a non-degenerate quadratic form q. Such a quadratic form can, given a suitable choice of basis (e_{1}, ..., e_{n}), be applied to a vector x = x_{1}e_{1} + ⋯ + x_{n}e_{n}, giving
$$q(x) = \left(x_1^2 + \dots + x_k^2\right) - \left( x_{k+1}^2 + \dots + x_n^2\right) ,$$
which is called the scalar square of the vector x.

For Euclidean spaces, k = n, implying that the quadratic form is positive-definite. When 0 < k < n, q is an isotropic quadratic form. If 1 ≤ i ≤ k < j ≤ n, then q(e_{i} + e_{j}) = 0, so that e_{i} + e_{j} is a null vector. In a pseudo-Euclidean space with k < n, unlike in a Euclidean space, there exist vectors with negative scalar square.

As with the term Euclidean space, the term pseudo-Euclidean space may be used to refer to an affine space or a vector space depending on the author, with the latter alternatively being referred to as a pseudo-Euclidean vector space (see Point–vector distinction).

== Geometry ==
The geometry of a pseudo-Euclidean space is consistent despite some properties of Euclidean space not applying, most notably that it is not a metric space as explained below. The affine structure is unchanged, and thus also the concepts line, plane and, generally, of an affine subspace (flat), as well as line segments.

=== Positive, zero, and negative scalar squares ===
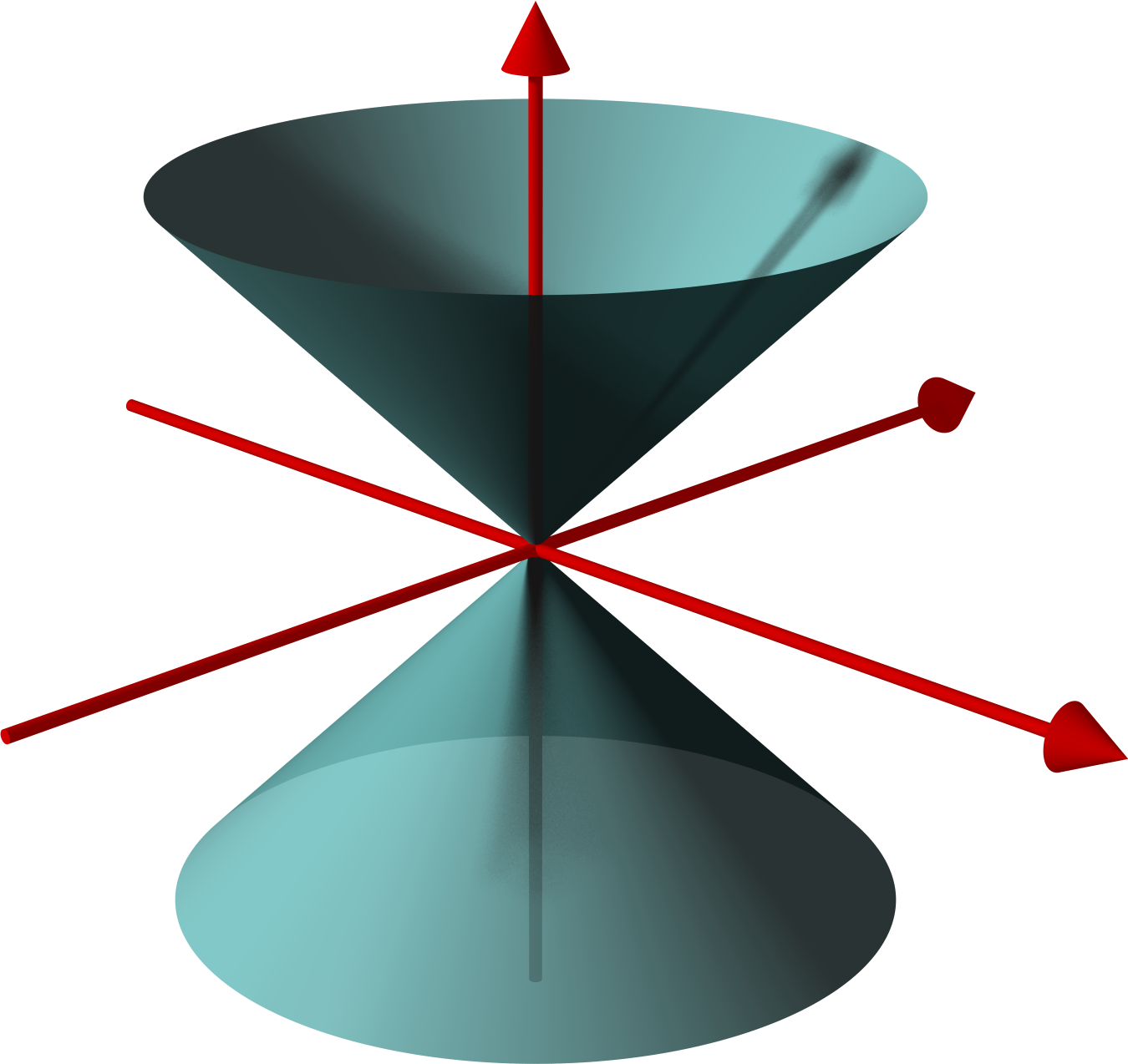
n = 3, k is either 1 or 2 depending on the choice of sign of q

A null vector is a vector for which the quadratic form is zero. Unlike in a Euclidean space, such a vector can be non-zero, in which case it is self-orthogonal. If the quadratic form is indefinite, a pseudo-Euclidean space has a linear cone of null vectors given by { x | q(x) = 0 }. When the pseudo-Euclidean space provides a model for spacetime (see below), the null cone is called the light cone of the origin.

The null cone separates two open sets, respectively for which q(x) > 0 and q(x) < 0. If k ≥ 2, then the set of vectors for which q(x) > 0 is connected. If k = 1, then it consists of two disjoint parts, one with x_{1} > 0 and another with x_{1} < 0. Similarly, if n − k ≥ 2, then the set of vectors for which q(x) < 0 is connected. If n − k = 1, then it consists of two disjoint parts, one with x_{n} > 0 and another with x_{n} < 0.

=== Interval ===
The quadratic form q corresponds to the square of a vector in the Euclidean case. To define the vector norm (and distance) in an invariant manner, one has to get square roots of scalar squares, which leads to possibly imaginary distances; see Square root of negative numbers. But even for a triangle with positive scalar squares of all three sides (whose square roots are real and positive), the triangle inequality does not hold in general.

Hence terms norm and distance are avoided in pseudo-Euclidean geometry, which may be replaced with scalar square and spacetime interval respectively.

Though, for a curve whose tangent vectors all have scalar squares of the same sign, the arc length is defined. It has important applications: see Proper time, for example.

=== Rotations and spheres ===
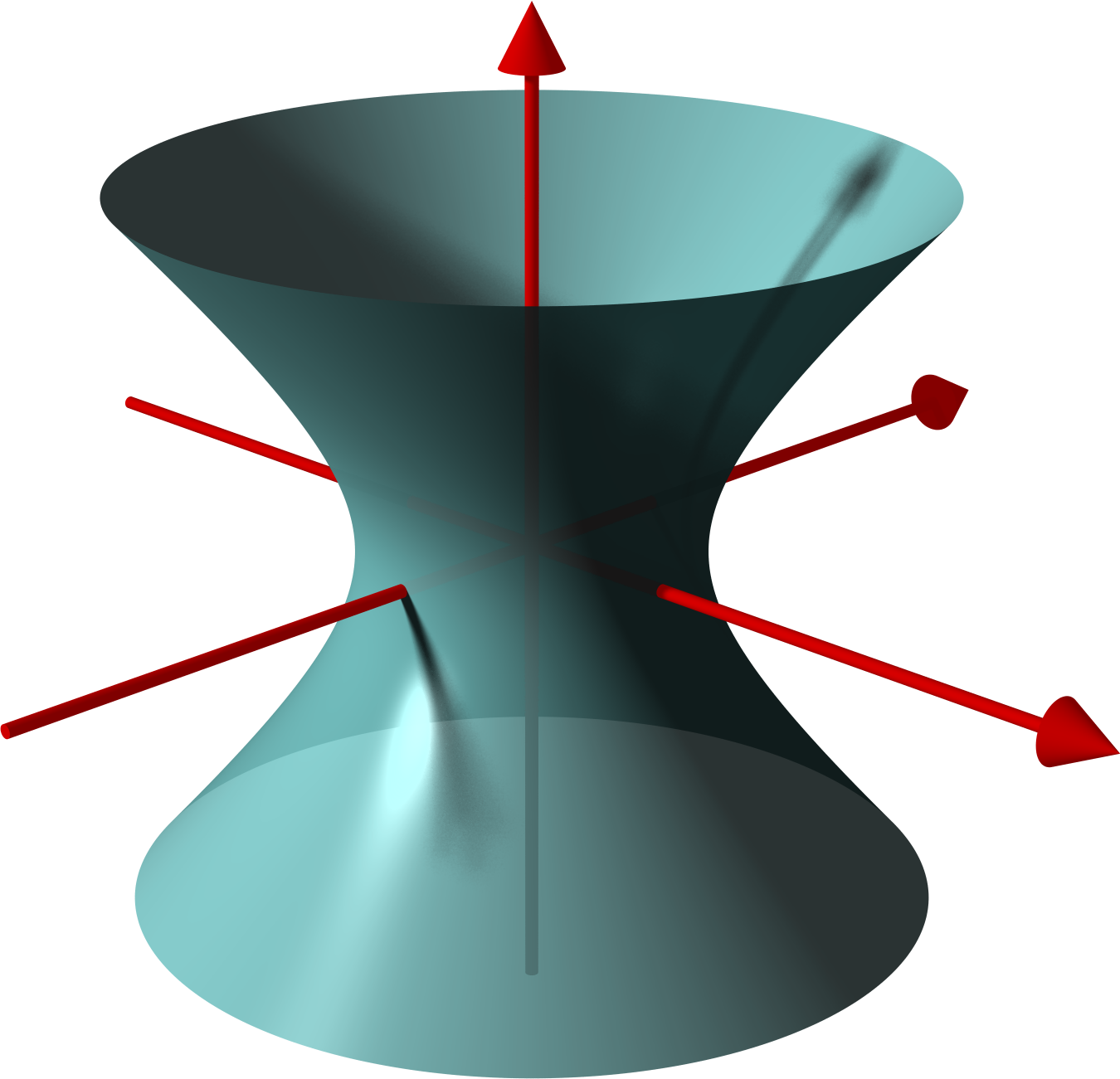

The rotations group of such space is the indefinite orthogonal group O(q), also denoted as O(k, n − k) without a reference to particular quadratic form. Such "rotations" preserve the form q and, hence, the scalar square of each vector including whether it is positive, zero, or negative.

Whereas Euclidean space has a unit sphere, pseudo-Euclidean space has the hypersurfaces { x | q(x) = 1 } and { x | q(x) = −1 }. Such a hypersurface, called a quasi-sphere, is preserved by the appropriate indefinite orthogonal group.

=== Symmetric bilinear form ===
The quadratic form q gives rise to a symmetric bilinear form defined as follows:
$$\langle x, y\rangle = \tfrac12[q(x + y) - q(x) - q(y)] = \left(x_1 y_1 + \ldots + x_k y_k\right) - \left(x_{k+1}y_{k+1} + \ldots + x_n y_n\right).$$
The quadratic form can be expressed in terms of the bilinear form: q(x) = ⟨x, x⟩.

When ⟨x, y⟩ = 0, x and y are orthogonal vectors of the pseudo-Euclidean space.

This bilinear form is often referred to as the scalar product, and sometimes as "inner product" or "dot product", but it does not define an inner product space and it does not have the properties of the dot product of Euclidean vectors.

If x and y are orthogonal and q(x)q(y) < 0, then x is hyperbolic-orthogonal to y.

The standard basis of the real n-space is orthogonal. There are no orthonormal bases in a pseudo-Euclidean space for which the bilinear form is indefinite, because it cannot be used to define a vector norm.

=== Subspaces and orthogonality ===
For a (positive-dimensional) subspace U of a pseudo-Euclidean space, when the quadratic form q is restricted to U, following three cases are possible:

1. q|_{U} is either positive or negative definite. Then, U is essentially Euclidean (up to the sign of q).
2. q|_{U} is indefinite, but non-degenerate. Then, U is itself pseudo-Euclidean. It is possible only if dim U ≥ 2; if dim U = 2, which means than U is a plane, then it is called a hyperbolic plane.
3. q|_{U} is degenerate.

One of the most jarring properties (for a Euclidean intuition) of pseudo-Euclidean vectors and flats is their orthogonality. When two non-zero Euclidean vectors are orthogonal, they are not collinear. The intersections of any Euclidean linear subspace with its orthogonal complement is the {0} subspace. But the definition from the previous subsection immediately implies that any vector ν of zero scalar square is orthogonal to itself. Hence, the isotropic line N = ⟨ν⟩ generated by a null vector ν is a subset of its orthogonal complement N^{⊥}.

The formal definition of the orthogonal complement of a vector subspace in a pseudo-Euclidean space gives a perfectly well-defined result, which satisfies the equality dim U + dim U^{⊥} = n due to the quadratic form's non-degeneracy. It is just the condition

U ∩ U^{⊥} = {0} or, equivalently, U + U^{⊥} = all space,

which can be broken if the subspace U contains a null direction. While subspaces form a lattice, as in any vector space, this ⊥ operation is not an orthocomplementation, in contrast to inner product spaces.

For a subspace N composed entirely of null vectors (which means that the scalar square q, restricted to N, equals to 0), always holds:

N ⊂ N^{⊥} or, equivalently, N ∩ N^{⊥} = N.

Such a subspace can have up to min(k, n − k) dimensions.

For a (positive) Euclidean k-subspace its orthogonal complement is a (n − k)-dimensional negative "Euclidean" subspace, and vice versa. Generally, for a (d_{+} + d_{−} + d_{0})-dimensional subspace U consisting of d_{+} positive and d_{−} negative dimensions (see Sylvester's law of inertia for clarification), its orthogonal "complement" U^{⊥} has (k − d_{+} − d_{0}) positive and (n − k − d_{−} − d_{0}) negative dimensions, while the rest d_{0} ones are degenerate and form the U ∩ U^{⊥} intersection.

=== Parallelogram law and Pythagorean theorem ===
The parallelogram law takes the form

$$q(x) + q(y) = \tfrac12(q(x + y) + q(x - y)).$$

Using the square of the sum identity, for an arbitrary triangle one can express the scalar square of the third side from scalar squares of two sides and their bilinear form product:

$$q(x + y) = q(x) + q(y) + 2\langle x, y \rangle.$$

This demonstrates that, for orthogonal vectors, a pseudo-Euclidean analog of the Pythagorean theorem holds:

$$\langle x, y \rangle = 0 \Rightarrow q(x) + q(y) = q(x + y).$$

== Algebra and tensor calculus ==
Like Euclidean spaces, every pseudo-Euclidean vector space generates a Clifford algebra. Unlike properties above, where replacement of q to −q changed numbers but not geometry, the sign reversal of the quadratic form results in a distinct Clifford algebra, so for example Cl_{1,2}(R) and Cl_{2,1}(R) are not isomorphic.

Just like over any vector space, there are pseudo-Euclidean tensors. Like with a Euclidean structure, there are raising and lowering indices operators but, unlike the case with Euclidean tensors, there is no bases where these operations do not change values of components. If there is a vector v^{β}, the corresponding covariant vector is:

$v_\alpha = q_{\alpha\beta} v^\beta\,,$

and with the standard-form

$$q_{\alpha\beta} = \begin{pmatrix}
I_{k\times k} &                     0 \\
0 & -I_{(n-k)\times(n-k)}
\end{pmatrix}$$

the first k components of v_{α} are numerically the same as ones of v^{β}, but the remaining n − k have the opposite sign.

The correspondence between contravariant and covariant tensors makes a tensor calculus on pseudo-Riemannian manifolds a generalization of one on Riemannian manifolds.

== Application ==
Conjugate hyperbolas in pseudo-Euclidean space with n = 2, k = 1

Suppose a pseudo-Euclidean space has two vectors, with non-zero quadratic forms, spanning a plane in the space. If the vectors have the same sign for their quadratic forms, the restriction of the spatial-form to the plane will be a definite quadratic form. In the other case the restriction yields an isotropic quadratic form. By rescaling axes, if necessary, the form becomes x^{2} − y^{2} and the plane is known as the hyperbolic plane in the theory of quadratic forms. When the form is set to plus and minus one, the solution sets are a pair of conjugate hyperbolas. This pair of figures, described long ago by Apollonius of Perga, was used in 1908 to indicate time and distance units by Hermann Minkowski.

The two planar cases give two theories of angle: the definite case corresponds to circular angle while the isotropic case yields hyperbolic angle. Just as a rotation by a circular angle can be represented by group action of the circle group on the complex plane, so hyperbolic rotation results from group action of the unit hyperbola group on the plane of split-complex numbers. In the theory of special relativity the idea of speed is changed to rapidity, which is a hyperbolic angle. In the jargon of physics, a hyperbolic rotation is a Lorentz boost.

The hyperbolic rotation does not conserve Euclidean distances, so it is not a Euclidean motion. Nevertheless, area is conserved, which is a Euclidean notion, so the geometry is pseudo-Euclidean but not Euclidean.

== See also ==
- Pseudo-Riemannian manifold
- Hyperbolic equation
- Hyperboloid model
- Paravector
