= Degenerate bilinear form =

Concept in linear algebra

In mathematics, specifically linear algebra, a degenerate bilinear form $f(x,y)$ on a vector space $V$ is a bilinear form such that the map from $V$ to $V^*$ (the dual space of $V$) given by $v\mapsto(x\mapsto f(x,v))$ has a non-trivial kernel, i.e. there exist some non-zero $x$ in $V$ such that $f(x,y)=0$ for all $y\in V$.

An equivalent definition when $V$ is finite-dimensional is that the previous map is not an isomorphism.

== Nondegenerate forms ==
A nondegenerate or nonsingular form is a bilinear form that is not degenerate, meaning that $v \mapsto (x \mapsto f(x,v))$ is an isomorphism, or equivalently in finite dimensions, if and only if

$f(x,y)=0$ for all $y \in V$ implies that $x = 0$.

== Using the determinant ==
If V is finite-dimensional then, relative to some basis for V, a bilinear form is degenerate if and only if the determinant of the associated matrix is zero – if and only if the matrix is singular, and accordingly degenerate forms are also called singular forms. Likewise, a nondegenerate form is one for which the associated matrix is non-singular, and accordingly nondegenerate forms are also referred to as non-singular forms. These statements are independent of the chosen basis.

== Related notions ==
If for a quadratic form Q there is a non-zero vector v ∈ V such that Q(v) = 0, then Q is an isotropic quadratic form. If Q has the same sign for all non-zero vectors, it is a definite quadratic form or an anisotropic quadratic form.

There is the closely related notion of a unimodular form and a perfect pairing; these agree over fields but not over general rings.

== Examples ==
The study of real, quadratic algebras shows the distinction between types of quadratic forms. The product zz* is a quadratic form for each of the complex numbers, split-complex numbers, and dual numbers. For z = x + ε y, the dual number form is x^{2} which is a degenerate quadratic form. The split-complex case is an isotropic form, and the complex case is a definite form.

The most important examples of nondegenerate forms are inner products and symplectic forms. Symmetric nondegenerate forms are important generalizations of inner products, in that often all that is required is that the map $V \to V^*$ be an isomorphism, not positivity. For example, a manifold with an inner product structure on its tangent spaces is a Riemannian manifold, while relaxing this to a symmetric nondegenerate form yields a pseudo-Riemannian manifold.

== Infinite dimensions ==
Note that in an infinite-dimensional space, we can have a bilinear form ƒ for which $v \mapsto (x \mapsto f(x,v))$ is injective but not surjective onto $V^*$. For example, on the space of continuous functions on a closed bounded interval, the form given by

$$f(\phi,\psi) = \int\psi(x)\phi(x) \,dx$$

is not surjective: for instance, the Dirac delta functional is in the dual space but not of the required form. On the other hand, this bilinear form satisfies

$f(\phi,\psi)=0$ for all $\phi$ implies that $\psi=0\,$,

and hence it is non-degenerate. In such a case where ƒ is injective but not (necessarily) surjective, ƒ can be said to be weakly nondegenerate for emphasis.

== Terminology ==
If f vanishes identically on all vectors it is said to be totally degenerate. Given any bilinear form f on V the set of vectors

$$\{x\in V \mid f(x,y) = 0 \mbox{ for all } y \in V\}$$

forms a totally degenerate subspace of V. The map f is nondegenerate if and only if this subspace is trivial.

Geometrically, an isotropic line of the quadratic form corresponds to a point of the associated quadric hypersurface in projective space. Such a line is additionally isotropic for the bilinear form if and only if the corresponding point is a singularity. Hence, over an algebraically closed field, Hilbert's Nullstellensatz guarantees that the quadratic form always has isotropic lines, while the bilinear form has them if and only if the surface is singular.

== See also ==
- Indefinite inner product space
- Dual system – Dual pair of vector spaces
- Linear form – Linear map from a vector space to its field of scalars
