= Real field =

Real field may refer to:

- Real numbers, the numbers that can be represented by infinite decimals
- Formally real field, an algebraic field that has the so-called "real" property
- Real closed field
- Real quadratic field
