= Hyperbolic plane (disambiguation) =

In mathematics, the term hyperbolic plane may refer to:

- A two-dimensional plane in hyperbolic geometry
- A quadratic space known as the hyperbolic plane (quadratic forms)
