= Symmetric form =

Symmetric form may refer to:

- Symmetric bilinear form
- Symmetric sesquilinear form
