= Witt ring =

In mathematics, a Witt ring may be

- A ring of Witt vectors
- The Witt ring (forms), a ring structure on the Witt group of symmetric bilinear forms
- See also Witt algebra, a Lie algebra.
