= Definite form =

Definite form may refer to:

- Definite quadratic form in mathematics
- Definiteness in linguistics
