= Witt group =

Algebra term

In mathematics, a Witt group of a field, named after Ernst Witt, is an abelian group whose elements are represented by symmetric bilinear forms over the field.

== Definition ==
Fix a field k of characteristic not equal to 2. All vector spaces will be assumed to be finite-dimensional. Two spaces equipped with symmetric bilinear forms are equivalent if one can be obtained from the other by adding a metabolic quadratic space, that is, zero or more copies of a hyperbolic plane, the non-degenerate two-dimensional symmetric bilinear form with a norm 0 vector. Each class is represented by the core form of a Witt decomposition.

The Witt group of k is the abelian group W(k) of equivalence classes of non-degenerate symmetric bilinear forms, with the group operation corresponding to the orthogonal direct sum of forms. It is additively generated by the classes of one-dimensional forms. Although classes may contain spaces of different dimension, the parity of the dimension is constant across a class and so rk: W(k) → Z/2Z is a homomorphism.

The elements of finite order in the Witt group have order a power of 2; the torsion subgroup is the kernel of the functorial map from W(k) to W(k^{py}), where k^{py} is the Pythagorean closure of k; it is generated by the Pfister forms $\langle\!\langle w \rangle\!\rangle = \langle 1, -w \rangle$ with $w$ a non-zero sum of squares. If k is not formally real, then the Witt group is torsion, with exponent a power of 2. The height of the field k is the exponent of the torsion in the Witt group, if this is finite, or ∞ otherwise.

== Ring structure ==
The Witt group of k can be given a commutative ring structure, by using the tensor product of quadratic forms to define the ring product. This is sometimes called the Witt ring W(k), though the term "Witt ring" is often also used for a completely different ring of Witt vectors.

To discuss the structure of this ring one assumes that k is of characteristic not equal to 2, so that one may identify symmetric bilinear forms and quadratic forms.

The kernel of the rank mod 2 homomorphism is a prime ideal, I, of the Witt ring termed the fundamental ideal. The ring homomorphisms from W(k) to Z correspond to the field orderings of k, by taking signature with respective to the ordering. The Witt ring is a Jacobson ring. It is a Noetherian ring if and only if there are finitely many square classes; that is, if the squares in k form a subgroup of finite index in the multiplicative group of k.

If k is not formally real, the fundamental ideal is the only prime ideal of W and consists precisely of the nilpotent elements; W is a local ring and has Krull dimension 0.

If k is real, then the nilpotent elements are precisely those of finite additive order, and these in turn are the forms all of whose signatures are 0; W has Krull dimension 1.

If k is a real Pythagorean field then the zero-divisors of W are the elements for which some signature is 0; otherwise, the zero-divisors are exactly the fundamental ideal.

If k is an ordered field with positive cone P then Sylvester's law of inertia holds for quadratic forms over k and the signature defines a ring homomorphism from W(k) to Z, with kernel a prime ideal K_{P}. These prime ideals are in bijection with the orderings X_{k} of k and constitute the minimal prime ideal spectrum MinSpec W(k) of W(k). The bijection is a homeomorphism between MinSpec W(k) with the Zariski topology and the set of orderings X_{k} with the Harrison topology.

The n-th power of the fundamental ideal is additively generated by the n-fold Pfister forms.

== Examples ==
- The Witt ring of C, and indeed any algebraically closed field or quadratically closed field, is Z/2Z.
- The Witt ring of R is Z.
- The Witt ring of a finite field F_{q} with q odd is Z/4Z if q ≡ 3 mod 4 and isomorphic to the group ring (Z/2Z)[F*/F*^{2}] if q ≡ 1 mod 4.
- The Witt ring of a local field with maximal ideal of norm congruent to 1 modulo 4 is isomorphic to the group ring (Z/2Z)[V] where V is the Klein 4-group.
- The Witt ring of a local field with maximal ideal of norm congruent to 3 modulo 4 is (Z/4Z)[C_{2}] where C_{2} is a cyclic group of order 2.
- The Witt ring of Q_{2} is of order 32 and is given by

$$\mathbf{Z}_8[s,t]/\langle2s,2t,s^2,t^2,st-4\rangle$$.

== Invariants ==
Certain invariants of a quadratic form can be regarded as functions on Witt classes. Dimension mod 2 is a function on classes: the discriminant is also well-defined. The Hasse invariant of a quadratic form is again, a well-defined function on Witt classes with values in the Brauer group of the field of definition.

=== Rank and discriminant ===
A ring is defined over K, Q(K), as a set of pairs (d, e) with d in K*/K*^{2} and e in Z/2Z. Addition and multiplication are defined by:

$$(d_1,e_1) + (d_2,e_2) =  ((-1)^{e_1e_2}d_1d_2, e_1+e_2)$$
$$(d_1,e_1)\cdot(d_2,e_2)=(d_1^{e_2}d_2^{e_1},e_1e_2)$$.

Then there is a surjective ring homomorphism from W(K) to this obtained by mapping a class to discriminant and rank mod 2. The kernel is I^{2}. The elements of Q may be regarded as classifying graded quadratic extensions of K.

=== Brauer–Wall group ===
The triple of discriminant, rank mod 2 and Hasse invariant defines a map from W(K) to the Brauer–Wall group BW(K).

== Witt ring of a local field ==
Let K be a complete local field with valuation v, uniformiser π and residue field k of characteristic not equal to 2. There is an injection W(k) → W(K) which lifts the diagonal form ⟨a_{1},...a_{n}⟩ to ⟨u_{1},...u_{n}⟩ where u_{i} is a unit of K with image a_{i} in k. This yields

$$W(K)=W(k)\oplus\langle\pi\rangle\cdot W(k)$$

identifying W(k) with its image in W(K).

== Witt ring of a number field ==
Let K be a number field. For quadratic forms over K, there is a Hasse invariant ±1 for every finite place corresponding to the Hilbert symbols. The invariants of a form over a number field are precisely the dimension, discriminant, all local Hasse invariants and the signatures coming from real embeddings.

The symbol ring is defined over K, Sym(K), as a set of triples (d, e, f ) with d in K*/K*^{2}, e in Z/2 and f a sequence of elements ±1 indexed by the places of K, subject to the condition that all but finitely many terms of f are +1, that the value on acomplex places is +1 and that the product of all the terms in f is +1. Let [a, b] be the sequence of Hilbert symbols: it satisfies the conditions on f just stated.

Addition and multiplication is defined as follows:

$$(d_1,e_1,f_1) + (d_2,e_2,f_2) =             ((-1)^{e_1e_2}d_1d_2, e_1+e_2, [d_1,d_2][-d_1d_2,(-1)^{e_1e_2}]f_1f_2)$$
$$(d_1,e_1,f_1) \cdot (d_2,e_2,f_2) =             (d_1^{e_2}d_2^{e_1}, e_1e_2, [d_1,d_2]^{1+e_1e_2}f_1^{e_2}f_2^{e_1})$$.

Then there is a surjective ring homomorphism from W(K) to Sym(K) obtained by mapping a class to discriminant, rank mod 2, and the sequence of Hasse invariants. The kernel is I^{3}.

The symbol ring is a realisation of the Brauer-Wall group.

=== Witt ring of the rationals ===
The Hasse–Minkowski theorem implies that there is an injection

$$W(\mathbf{Q})\rightarrow W(\mathbf{R})\oplus\prod_p W(\mathbf{Q}_p)$$.

One can make this concrete and compute the image by using the "second residue homomorphism" W(Q_{p}) → W(F_{p}). Composed with the map W(Q) → W(Q_{p}), one obtains a group homomorphism ∂_{p}: W(Q) → W(F_{p}) (for p = 2, ∂_{2} is defined to be the 2-adic valuation of the discriminant, taken mod 2).

One will then have a split exact sequence

$$0 \rightarrow \mathbf{Z} \rightarrow W(\mathbf{Q}) \rightarrow  \mathbf{Z}/2 \oplus \bigoplus_{p\ne2} W(\mathbf{F}_p) \rightarrow 0 \$$

which can be written as an isomorphism

$$W(\mathbf{Q})\cong\mathbf{Z}\oplus\mathbf{Z}/2\oplus\bigoplus_{p\ne2}W(\mathbf{F}_p)$$

where the first component is the signature.

== Witt ring and Milnor's K-theory ==
Let k be a field of characteristic not equal to 2. The powers of the ideal I of forms of even dimension ("fundamental ideal") in $W(k)$ form a descending filtration and one may consider the associated graded ring, that is the direct sum of quotients $I^n/I^{n+1}$. Let $\langle a\rangle$ be the quadratic form $ax^2$ considered as an element of the Witt ring. Then $\langle a\rangle-\langle 1\rangle$ is an element of I and correspondingly a product of the form

$$\langle\langle a_1,\ldots ,a_n\rangle\rangle = (\langle a_1\rangle - \langle 1\rangle)\cdots (\langle a_n\rangle - \langle 1\rangle)$$

is an element of $I^n$. John Milnor in a 1970 paper proved that the mapping from $(k^*)^n$ to $I^n/I^{n+1}$ that sends $(a_1,\ldots ,a_n)$ to $\langle\langle a_1,\ldots ,a_n\rangle\rangle$ is multilinear and maps Steinberg elements (elements such that for some $i$ and $j$ such that $i\ne j$ one has $a_i+a_j=1$) to 0. This means that this mapping defines a homomorphism from the Milnor ring of k to the graded Witt ring. Milnor showed also that this homomorphism sends elements divisible by 2 to 0 and that it is surjective. In the same paper, he made a conjecture that this homomorphism is an isomorphism for all fields k (of characteristic different from 2). This became known as the Milnor conjecture on quadratic forms.

The conjecture was proved by Dmitry Orlov, Alexander Vishik, and Vladimir Voevodsky in 1996 (published in 2007) for the case $\textrm{char}(k)=0$, leading to increased understanding of the structure of quadratic forms over arbitrary fields.

== Grothendieck–Witt ring ==
The Grothendieck–Witt ring GW is a related construction generated by isometry classes of nonsingular quadratic spaces with addition given by orthogonal sum and multiplication given by tensor product. Since two spaces that differ by a hyperbolic plane are not identified in GW, the inverse for the addition needs to be introduced formally through the construction that was discovered by Grothendieck (see Grothendieck group). There is a natural homomorphism GW → Z given by dimension: a field is quadratically closed if and only if this is an isomorphism. The hyperbolic spaces generate an ideal in GW and the Witt ring W is the quotient. The exterior power gives the Grothendieck–Witt ring the additional structure of a λ-ring.

=== Examples ===
- The Grothendieck–Witt ring of C, and indeed any algebraically closed field or quadratically closed field, is Z.
- The Grothendieck–Witt ring of R is isomorphic to the group ring Z[C_{2}], where C_{2} is a cyclic group of order 2.
- The Grothendieck–Witt ring of any finite field of odd characteristic is Z ⊕ Z/2Z with trivial multiplication in the second component. The element (1, 0) corresponds to the quadratic form ⟨1⟩.
- The Grothendieck–Witt ring of a local field with maximal ideal of norm congruent to 1 modulo 4 is isomorphic to Z ⊕ (Z/2Z)^{3}.
- The Grothendieck–Witt ring of a local field with maximal ideal of norm congruent to 3 modulo 4 is Z ⊕ Z/4Z ⊕ Z/2Z.

== Grothendieck–Witt ring and motivic stable homotopy groups of spheres ==
Fabien Morel showed that the Grothendieck–Witt ring of a perfect field is isomorphic to the motivic stable homotopy group of spheres π_{0,0}(S^{0,0}) (see "A¹ homotopy theory").

== Witt equivalence ==
Two fields are said to be Witt equivalent if their Witt rings are isomorphic.

For global fields there is a local-to-global principle: two global fields are Witt equivalent if and only if there is a bijection between their places such that the corresponding local fields are Witt equivalent. In particular, two number fields K and L are Witt equivalent if and only if there is a bijection T between the places of K and the places of L and a group isomorphism t between their square-class groups, preserving degree 2 Hilbert symbols. In this case the pair (T, t) is called a reciprocity equivalence or a degree 2 Hilbert symbol equivalence. Some variations and extensions of this condition, such as "tame degree l Hilbert symbol equivalence", have also been studied.

== Generalizations ==
Witt groups can also be defined in the same way for skew-symmetric forms, and for quadratic forms, and more generally ε-quadratic forms, over any *-ring R.

The resulting groups (and generalizations thereof) are known as the even-dimensional symmetric L-groups L^{2k}(R) and even-dimensional quadratic L-groups L_{2k}(R). The quadratic L-groups are 4-periodic, with L_{0}(R) being the Witt group of (1)-quadratic forms (symmetric), and L_{2}(R) being the Witt group of (−1)-quadratic forms (skew-symmetric); symmetric L-groups are not 4-periodic for all rings, hence they provide a less exact generalization.

L-groups are central objects in surgery theory, forming one of the three terms of the surgery exact sequence.

== See also ==
- Reduced height of a field
