= Quadratically closed field =

In mathematics, a quadratically closed field is a field of characteristic not equal to 2 in which every element has a square root.

== Examples ==
- The field of complex numbers is quadratically closed; more generally, any algebraically closed field is quadratically closed.
- The field of real numbers is not quadratically closed as it does not contain a square root of −1.
- The union of the finite fields $\mathbb F_{5^{2^n}}$ for n ≥ 0 is quadratically closed but not algebraically closed.

== Properties ==
- A field is quadratically closed if and only if it has universal invariant equal to 1.
- Every quadratically closed field is a Pythagorean field but not conversely (for example, R is Pythagorean); however, every non-formally real Pythagorean field is quadratically closed.
- A field is quadratically closed if and only if its Witt–Grothendieck ring is isomorphic to Z under the dimension mapping.
- A formally real Euclidean field E is not quadratically closed (as −1 is not a square in E) but the quadratic extension E(√−1) is quadratically closed.
- Let E/F be a finite extension where E is quadratically closed. Either −1 is a square in F and F is quadratically closed, or −1 is not a square in F and F is Euclidean. This "going-down theorem" may be deduced from the Diller–Dress theorem.

== Quadratic closure ==
A quadratic closure of a field F is a quadratically closed field containing F which embeds in any quadratically closed field containing F. A quadratic closure for any given F may be constructed as a subfield of the algebraic closure F^{alg} of F, as the union of all iterated quadratic extensions of F in F^{alg}.

=== Examples ===
- The quadratic closure of R is C.
- The quadratic closure of $\mathbb F_5$ is the union of the $\mathbb F_{5^{2^n}}$.
- The quadratic closure of Q is the field of complex constructible numbers.
