= Hasse–Minkowski theorem =

Local–global principle for quadratic forms

Two completions of the rational numbers, the dyadic numbers (here, only the dyadic integers are shown) and the real numbers. The Hasse-Minkowski theorem gives a relationship between quadratic forms in a number field and in the completions of the number field.

The Hasse–Minkowski theorem is a fundamental result in number theory which states that two quadratic forms over a number field are equivalent if and only if they are equivalent locally at all places, i.e. equivalent over every topological completion of the field (which may be real, complex, or p-adic). A related result is that a quadratic space over a number field is isotropic if and only if it is isotropic locally everywhere, or equivalently, that a quadratic form over a number field nontrivially represents zero if and only if this holds for all completions of the field. The theorem was proved in the case of the field of rational numbers by Hermann Minkowski and generalized to number fields by Helmut Hasse. The same statement holds even more generally for all global fields.

== Importance ==
The importance of the Hasse–Minkowski theorem lies in the novel paradigm it presented for answering arithmetical questions: in order to determine whether an equation of a certain type has a solution in rational numbers, it is sufficient to test whether it has solutions over complete fields of real and p-adic numbers, where one can apply analytic techniques such as Newton's method and its p-adic analogue Hensel's lemma. This is the first significant example of a local-global principle, one of the most fundamental techniques in arithmetic geometry.

== Application to the classification of quadratic forms ==
The Hasse–Minkowski theorem reduces the problem of classifying quadratic forms over a number field K up to equivalence to the set of analogous but much simpler questions over local fields. Basic invariants of a nonsingular quadratic form are its dimension, which is a positive integer, and its discriminant modulo the squares in K, which is an element of the multiplicative group K^{*}/K^{*2}. In addition, for every place v of K, there is an invariant coming from the completion K_{v}. Depending on the choice of v, this completion may be the real numbers R, the complex numbers C, or a p-adic number field, each of which has different kinds of invariants:

- Case of R. By Sylvester's law of inertia, the signature (or, alternatively, the negative index of inertia) is a complete invariant.
- Case of C. All nonsingular quadratic forms of the same dimension are equivalent.
- Case of Q_{p} and its algebraic extensions. Forms of the same dimension are classified up to equivalence by their Hasse invariant.

These invariants must satisfy some compatibility conditions: a parity relation (the sign of the discriminant must match the negative index of inertia) and a product formula (a local–global relation). Conversely, for every set of invariants satisfying these relations, there is a quadratic form over K with these invariants.
