= Isometry group =

Automorphism group of a metric space or pseudo-Euclidean space

In mathematics, the isometry group of a metric space is the set of all bijective isometries (that is, bijective, distance-preserving maps) from the metric space onto itself, with the function composition as group operation. Its identity element is the identity function. The elements of the isometry group are sometimes called motions of the space.

Every isometry group of a metric space is a subgroup of isometries. It represents in most cases a possible set of symmetries of objects/figures in the space, or functions defined on the space. See symmetry group.

A discrete isometry group is an isometry group such that for every point of the space the set of images of the point under the isometries is a discrete set.

In pseudo-Euclidean space the metric is replaced with an isotropic quadratic form; transformations preserving this form are sometimes called "isometries", and the collection of them is then said to form an isometry group of the pseudo-Euclidean space.

== Examples ==
- The isometry group of the subspace of a metric space consisting of the points of a scalene triangle is the trivial group. A similar space for an isosceles triangle is the cyclic group of order two, C_{2}. A similar space for an equilateral triangle is D_{3}, the dihedral group of order 6.
- The isometry group of a two-dimensional sphere is the orthogonal group O(3).
- The isometry group of the n-dimensional Euclidean space is the Euclidean group E(n).
- The isometry group of the Poincaré disc model of the hyperbolic plane is the projective special unitary group PSU(1,1).
- The isometry group of the Poincaré half-plane model of the hyperbolic plane is PSL(2,R).
- The isometry group of Minkowski space is the Poincaré group.
- Riemannian symmetric spaces are important cases where the isometry group is a Lie group.

== See also ==
- Point group
- Point groups in two dimensions
- Point groups in three dimensions
- Fixed points of isometry groups in Euclidean space
