= Null vector =

Vector on which a quadratic form is zero

A null cone where $q(x,y,z) = x^2 + y^2 - z^2 .$

In mathematics, given a vector space X with an associated quadratic form q, written (X, q), a null vector or isotropic vector is a non-zero element x of X for which q(x) = 0.

In the theory of real bilinear forms, definite quadratic forms and isotropic quadratic forms are distinct. They are distinguished in that only for the latter does there exist a nonzero null vector.

A quadratic space (X, q) which has a null vector is called a pseudo-Euclidean space. The term isotropic vector v when q(v) = 0 has been used in quadratic spaces, and anisotropic space for a quadratic space without null vectors.

A pseudo-Euclidean vector space may be decomposed (non-uniquely) into orthogonal subspaces A and B, X = A + B, where q is positive-definite on A and negative-definite on B. The null cone, or isotropic cone, of X consists of the union of balanced spheres:
$$\bigcup_{r \geq 0} \{x = a + b : q(a) = -q(b) = r, \ \ a \in A, b \in B \}.$$
The null cone is also the union of the isotropic lines through the origin.

== Split algebras ==
A composition algebra with a null vector is a split algebra.

In a composition algebra (A, +, ×, *), the quadratic form is q(x) = x x*. When x is a null vector then there is no multiplicative inverse for x, and since x ≠ 0, A is not a division algebra.

In the Cayley–Dickson construction, the split algebras arise in the series bicomplex numbers, biquaternions, and bioctonions, which uses the complex number field $\Complex$ as the foundation of this doubling construction due to L. E. Dickson (1919). In particular, these algebras have two imaginary units, which commute so their product, when squared, yields +1:

$(hi)^2 = h^2 i^2 = (-1)(-1) = +1 .$ Then
$(1 + hi)(1 + hi)^* = (1 +hi)(1 - hi) = 1 - (hi)^2 = 0$ so 1 + hi is a null vector.

The real subalgebras, split complex numbers, split quaternions, and split-octonions, with their null cones representing the light tracking into and out of 0 ∈ A, suggest spacetime topology.

== Examples ==
The light-like vectors of Minkowski space are null vectors.

The four linearly independent biquaternions l = 1 + hi, n = 1 + hj, m = 1 + hk, and m^{∗} = 1 – hk are null vectors and { l, n, m, m^{∗} } can serve as a basis for the subspace used to represent spacetime. Null vectors are also used in the Newman–Penrose formalism approach to spacetime manifolds.

In the Verma module of a Lie algebra there are null vectors.
