= Square class =

In a commutative ring, an equivalence class modulo squares

In mathematics, specifically abstract algebra, a square class of a field $F$ is an element of the square class group, the quotient group $F^\times/ F^{\times 2}$ of the multiplicative group of nonzero elements in the field modulo the square elements of the field. Each square class is a subset of the nonzero elements (a coset of the multiplicative group) consisting of the elements of the form xy^{2} where x is some particular fixed element and y ranges over all nonzero field elements.

For instance, if $F=\mathbb{R}$, the field of real numbers, then $F^\times$ is just the group of all nonzero real numbers (with the multiplication operation) and $F^{\times 2}$ is the subgroup of positive numbers (as every positive number has a real square root). The quotient of these two groups is a group with two elements, corresponding to two cosets: the set of positive numbers and the set of negative numbers. Thus, the real numbers have two square classes, the positive numbers and the negative numbers.

Square classes are frequently studied in relation to the theory of quadratic forms. The reason is that if $V$ is an $F$-vector space and $q:V \to F$ is a quadratic form and $v$ is an element of $V$ such that $q(v) = a \in F^\times$, then for all $u \in F^\times$, $q(uv) = au^2$ and thus it is sometimes more convenient to talk about the square classes which the quadratic form represents.

Every element of the square class group is an involution. It follows that, if the number of square classes of a field is finite, it must be a power of two.
