= Isotropic quadratic form =

Quadratic form for which there is a non-zero vector on which the form evaluates to zero

In mathematics, a quadratic form over a field F is said to be isotropic if there is a non-zero vector on which the form evaluates to zero; otherwise, it is anisotropic. More explicitly, if q is a quadratic form on a vector space V over F, then a non-zero vector v in V is said to be isotropic if q(v) = 0. A quadratic form is isotropic if and only if there exists a non-zero isotropic vector (or null vector) for that quadratic form.

Suppose that (V, q) is quadratic space and W is a subspace of V. Then W is called an isotropic subspace of V if some vector in it is isotropic, a totally isotropic subspace if all vectors in it are isotropic, and an anisotropic subspace if it does not contain any (non-zero) isotropic vectors. The isotropy index of a quadratic space is the maximum of the dimensions of the totally isotropic subspaces.

Over the real numbers, more generally in the case where F is a real closed field (so that the signature is defined), if the quadratic form is non-degenerate and has the signature (a, b), then its isotropy index is the minimum of a and b. An anisotropic quadratic form over a real closed field is always definite. An important example of an isotropic form over the reals occurs in pseudo-Euclidean space.

== Hyperbolic plane ==
F= real numbers, quadratic form r, isotropic elements are red, r = 1 blue, r = −1 green, conjugate hyperbolas

Let F be a field of characteristic not 2 and V = F^{2}. If we consider the general element (x, y) of V, then the quadratic forms q = xy and r = x^{2} − y^{2} are equivalent since there is a linear transformation on V that makes q look like r, and vice versa. Evidently, (V, q) and (V, r) are isotropic. This example is called the hyperbolic plane in the theory of quadratic forms. A common instance has F = real numbers in which case {x ∈ V : q(x) = nonzero constant} and {x ∈ V : r(x) = nonzero constant} are hyperbolas. In particular, {x ∈ V : r(x) = 1} is the unit hyperbola. The notation ⟨1⟩ ⊕ ⟨−1⟩ has been used by Milnor and Husemoller for the hyperbolic plane as the signs of the terms of the bivariate polynomial r are exhibited.

The affine hyperbolic plane was described by Emil Artin as a quadratic space with basis {M, N} satisfying M^{2} = N^{2} = 0, NM = 1, where the products represent the quadratic form.

Through the polarization identity the quadratic form is related to a symmetric bilinear form B(u, v) = 1/4(q(u + v) − q(u − v)).

Two vectors u and v are orthogonal when B(u, v) = 0. In the case of the hyperbolic plane, such u and v are hyperbolic-orthogonal.

== Split quadratic space ==
A space with quadratic form is split (or metabolic) if there is a subspace which is equal to its own orthogonal complement; equivalently, the index of isotropy is equal to half the dimension. The hyperbolic plane is an example, and over a field of characteristic not equal to 2, every split space is a direct sum of hyperbolic planes.

In a split quadratic space of dimension $2n$, the null cone has dimension $2n-1$. The null cone contains an $O(n)$ family of $n$-flats. Concretely in $\R^{n+n}$, the null cone is defined by the equation $x_1^2 + \dots x_n^2 = y_1^2 + \dots y_n^2$, and each of its $n$-flats is defined by the parametric equation $y = Ax$, where $A \in O(n)$ and $x \in \R^n$.

As an example, the null cone in $\R^{2+2}$ contains an $O(2)$ family of 2-flats. That is, we have a circle of 2-flats, and another circle obtained by taking its mirror reflection. This gives us several well-known foliations:

- The null cone intersects each 3-sphere at a Clifford torus, and the $O(2)$ family of 2-flats intersects the torus at two families of circles. Taking a stereographic projection, this gives the Villarceau circles of the torus.
- Intersecting the $y_2=1$ plane yields a 1-sheet hyperboloid $x_1^2 + x_2^2 - y_1^2 = 1$, and the $O(2)$ family of 2-flats intersects the 1-sheet hyperboloid at two families of lines. This shows that the 1-sheet hyperboloid is doubly-ruled.
- Intersecting the $x_2 - y_2=1$ yields a hyperbolic paraboloid $x_2 +y_2 = y_1^2 - x_1^2$, and the 2-flats doubly-rule it.

The Klein quadric is isomorphic to the projectivized null cone of $\R^{3+3}$.

== Relation with classification of quadratic forms ==
From the point of view of classification of quadratic forms, spaces with anisotropic quadratic forms are the basic building blocks for quadratic spaces of arbitrary dimensions. For a general field F, classification of anisotropic quadratic forms is a nontrivial problem. By contrast, the isotropic forms are usually much easier to handle. By Witt's decomposition theorem, every inner product space over a field is an orthogonal direct sum of a split space and a space with definite quadratic form.

== Field theory ==
- If F is an algebraically closed field, for example, the field of complex numbers, and (V, q) is a quadratic space of dimension at least two, then it is isotropic.
- If F is a finite field and (V, q) is a quadratic space of dimension at least three, then it is isotropic (this is a consequence of the Chevalley–Warning theorem).
- If F is the field Q_{p} of p-adic numbers and (V, q) is a quadratic space of dimension at least five, then it is isotropic.

== See also ==
- Isotropic line
- Polar space
- Witt group
- Witt ring (forms)
- Universal quadratic form
