= Portrait of Alexis de Tocqueville =

Painting by Théodore Chassériau

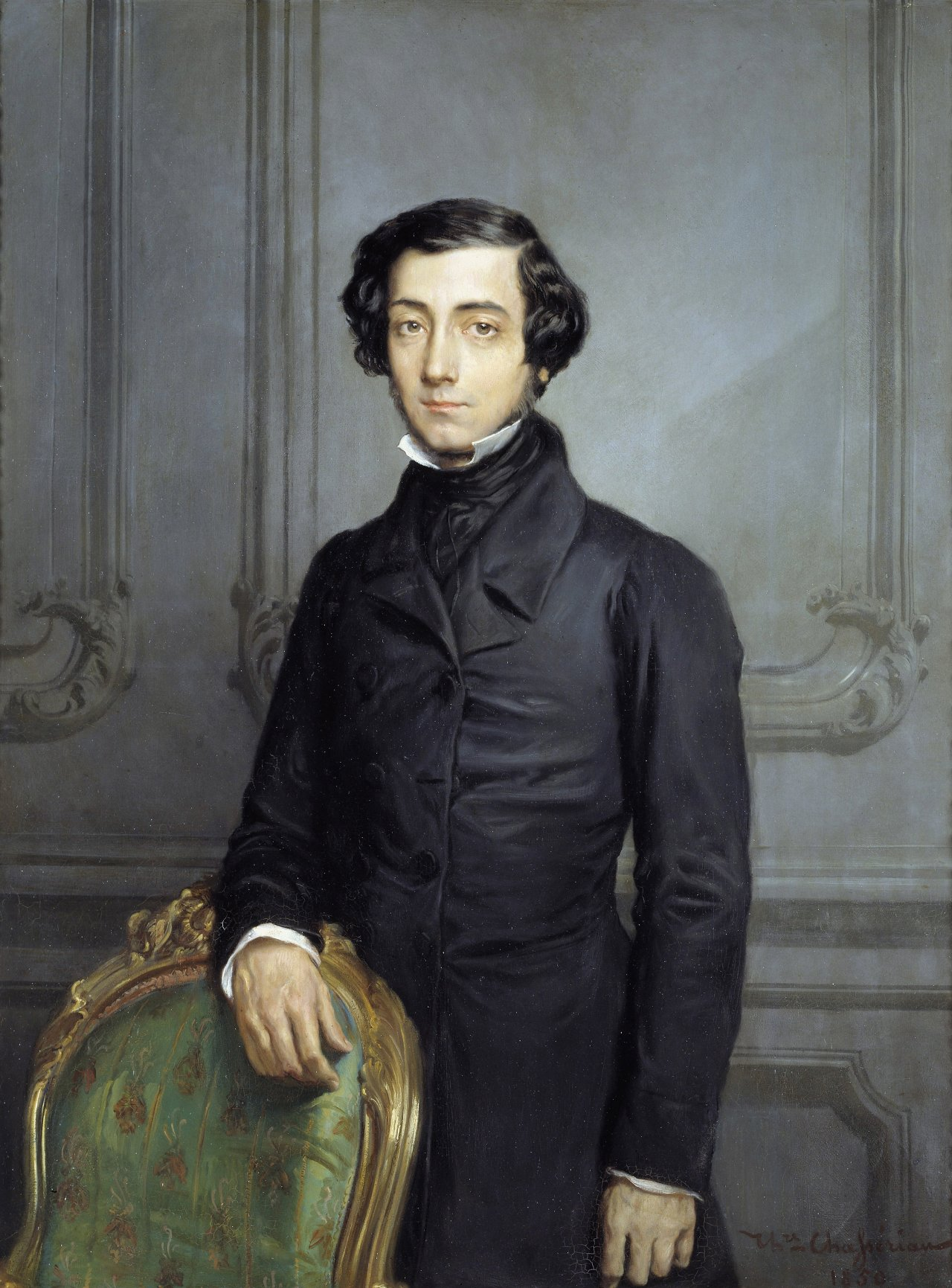
- Artist: Théodore Chassériau
- Year: 1850
- Type: Oil on canvas, portrait painting
- Dimensions: 131.5 cm × 98.5 cm (51.8 in × 38.8 in)
- Location: Palace of Versailles, Versailles

Portrait of Alexis de Tocqueville is an oil on canvas portrait painting by the French artist Théodore Chassériau, from 1850. It portrays the French politician and historian Alexis de Tocqueville. Known for his writings such as Democracy in America and The Old Regime and the Revolution. The year after the portrait was produced he opposed the 1851 French coup d'état by Napoleon III and retired from public life to concentrate on his history writing. Chassériau was a noted artist of the romantic era. The painting was acquired by the French state in 1948 and is now in the Musée de l'Histoire de France at the Palace of Versailles.

== Bibliography ==
- Brogan, Hugh. Alexis de Tocqueville: Prophet of Democracy in the Age of Revolution. Profile Books, 2010.
- Sandoz, Marc Théodore Chassériau, 1819-1856: Catalogue raisonné des peintures et estampes. 1974.
