= The Alexis de Tocqueville Tour: Exploring Democracy in America =

1997-98 educational series produced by C-SPAN

- Country of origin: United States
- Original language: English

Original release
- Network: C-SPAN
- Release: April 26, 1997 – January 19, 1998

The Alexis de Tocqueville Tour was a series of programs produced by C-SPAN in 1997 and 1998 that followed the path taken by Alexis de Tocqueville and Gustave de Beaumont through the United States during their 1831–32 visit. It explored many of the themes that Tocqueville discussed in Democracy in America, the two-volume work that he wrote based on his American travels. A C-SPAN School Bus traveled to each of the stops made by Tocqueville and Beaumont. Many of the Tocqueville programs were segments of C-SPAN's morning news and call-in show, Washington Journal, and they were timed to coincide with the anniversaries of Tocqueville and Beaumont's visits to those places. Typically, they were about 30 minutes long, and incorporated calls, e-mails, and faxes from viewers.

Professor John Splaine of the University of Maryland, College Park consulted on the series, and six other historians and academics served as advisors: Peter Lawler of Berry College; Daniel Mahoney of Assumption College; Harvey Mansfield of Harvard University; Ken Masugi of the United States Air Force Academy; Jim Schleifer of the College of New Rochelle; and Delba Winthrop of Harvard University.

== Background ==
C-SPAN CEO Brian Lamb described the basis for the Tocqueville project as follows:

"Out of that experience [the 1994 reenactments of the Lincoln-Douglas Debates] and Booknotes, this small town Midwesterner [referring to himself] came again to the constant reference to Alexis de Tocqueville. Time and time again, left and right, Democrat and Republican, all the politicians would quote Alexis de Tocqueville—often incorrectly. It was amazing to me when I found out. There's a famous quote attributed to Tocqueville: "America is great because America is good. If America ever stops being good, it will stop being great." He just never said it. Presidents, President Clinton, former Speaker Gingrich, and lots of other politicians have constantly repeated that quote, and it's not true. So that was one of the small offshoots that we learned by going around the United States, stopping in 55 communities. We started, by the way, at his chateau in Normandy, France, where we did a four-hour live program on Saturday morning in May of 1995."

== Tour programs ==
Note: John Splaine of the University of Maryland, College Park appeared as a commentator in numerous Tocqueville programs. Various local historians, journalists, and citizens also appeared as interviewees.

Original air date with link to video	Location	Theme / Comments
April 26, 1997	Normandy, France	This four-hour program was aired from the Tocqueville family chateau in Normandy, France, and featured interviews with a number of Tocqueville's descendants.
May 9, 1997	Newport, Rhode Island	"Tocqueville in Rhode Island" – This program was the first of the bus tour stops, and took place in the Old Colony House and ran the full three hours of the Washington Journal program. Interviewees included U.S. Senators John Chafee and Jack Reed, Newport Mayor David Gordon, and Tocqueville descendant Alexis D'Herouville.
May 12, 1997	New York City, New York	Featured discussion of Tocqueville's reaction to his steamboat ride from Newport to New York City, and his observations on New York city itself.
May 29, 1997	Ossining, New York	Featured discussion of the history and current state of the American penal system, focusing on Sing Sing.
June 6, 1997	Greenburgh, New York	Featured discussion with Greenburgh Supervisor Paul Feiner and Harvard philosophy professor Michael Sandel.
June 30, 1997	Yonkers, New York	Featured discussion with CUNY history professor John Patrick Diggins and Yonkers Mayor John Spencer.
July 1, 1997	Peekskill, New York	Featured discussion of the history and current status of Peekskill.
July 2, 1997	Newburgh, New York	Featured discussion of the Hudson River area in the 1830s, including steamboat travel.
July 3, 1997	Niskayuna, New York	Featured discussion of the Shakers, and other aspects of religion in the United States in the 1830s.
July 4, 1997	Albany, New York	Featured discussion with Legislative Gazette publisher Alan Chartock, Albany Mayor Jerry Jennings, and Steven Schechter of Russell Sage College.
July 7, 1997	Utica, New York	Featured discussion of a Tocqueville essay contest, and also of use of Tocqueville in the college classroom.
July 8, 1997	Syracuse, New York	Featured discussion with Oren Lyons about Tocqueville's observations on Native Americans.
July 9, 1997	Fort Brewerton, New York	Featured discussion with Eugene McCarthy about French influences in the Finger Lakes region of New York State.
July 10, 1997	Auburn, New York	Featured discussion of Tocqueville's observations on the American penal system, including discussion of Auburn Prison.
July 16, 1997	Canandaigua, New York	Featured discussion of Tocqueville's observations on freedom of the press.
July 17, 1997	Batavia, New York	Featured discussion of misquotation and misinterpretation of Tocqueville.
July 18, 1997	Buffalo, New York	Featured discussion with Buffalo Mayor Anthony Masiello.
July 21, 1997	Erie, Pennsylvania	Featured discussion of volunteerism.
July 22, 1997	Cleveland, Ohio	Featured discussion of the use of Tocqueville in the college classroom.
July 23, 1997	Detroit, Michigan	Featured discussion of race relations.
July 24, 1997	Pontiac, Michigan	Featured discussion with State Senator Gary Peters.
July 25, 1997	Flint, Michigan	Featured discussion of industry in Tocqueville's time.
July 28, 1997	Saginaw, Michigan	Featured discussion of the Saginaw area in the 1830s.
August 1, 1997	Fort Gratiot, Michigan	Featured discussion with Rep. Walter Capps.
August 5, 1997	Sault Ste. Marie, Michigan	Featured discussion of Sault Ste. Marie during the 1830s.
August 7, 1997	Mackinac Island, Michigan	Featured discussion of Mackinac Island during the 1830s.
August 11, 1997	Green Bay, Wisconsin	Featured discussion of Tocqueville's observations on lawyers and the law.
August 13, 1997	Michillimackinac, Michigan	"Tocqueville on Liberty and Equality" – Featured discussion with University of Maryland, College Park professor William Galston.
August 18, 1997	Niagara Falls, New York	"Citizens on Tocqueville"
August 23, 1997	Montreal, Canada	Featured discussion with Gregory Baum on the role of the Catholic Church in Montreal.
August 25, 1997	Quebec, Canada	Featured discussion of local journalism.
September 4, 1997	Whitehall, New York	Featured discussion with Michael Barone
September 8, 1997	Stockbridge, Massachusetts	Featured discussion of Tocqueville's meeting with Theodore Sedgwick.
September 9, 1997	Boston, Massachusetts	Featured discussion with Peter Gomes about Tocqueville's meeting with Jared Sparks.
October 6, 1997	Hartford, Connecticut	Featured discussion with Connecticut Secretary of State Miles S. Rapoport.
October 7, 1997	Wethersfield, Connecticut	Featured discussion with Connecticut State Senator Biagio Ciotto and Connecticut State Representative Richard Tulisano.
October 13, 1997	Philadelphia, Pennsylvania	Featured a tour of and discussion about Eastern State Penitentiary.
October 28, 1997	Baltimore, Maryland	"Tocqueville and Race Relations" – Featured discussion of the Hampden neighborhood of Baltimore.
November 25, 1997	Pittsburgh, Pennsylvania	"Democracy in America Town Hall Meeting"
November 26, 1997	Wheeling, West Virginia	"Tocqueville on Equality in America"
December 1, 1997	Cincinnati, Ohio	"Tocqueville on the U.S. Justice System" – Featured discussion with Judge Nathaniel R. Jones.
December 5, 1997	Westport, Kentucky	"Tocqueville on American Character"
December 8, 1997	Louisville, Kentucky	"Louisville Growth"
December 11, 1997	Nashville, Tennessee	Featured discussion of Tocqueville's visit to The Hermitage.
December 17, 1997	Memphis, Tennessee	Featured discussion of communications and transportation in Memphis.
January 1, 1998	New Orleans, Louisiana	Featured discussion with Douglas Brinkley
January 5, 1998	Mobile, Alabama	"French and U.S. Cultures"
January 6, 1998	Montgomery, Alabama	"Republic vs. Democracy"
January 8, 1998	Knoxville, Georgia	"Justice System in Small Towns"
January 9, 1998	Macon, Georgia	"African-American Churches and Democracy"
January 12, 1998	Milledgeville, Georgia	Featured discussion of the Georgia Military College
January 13, 1998	Augusta, Georgia	"Theater and Democracy"; Featured discussion with Norman Easterbrook of the Imperial Theatre.
January 14, 1998	Columbia, South Carolina	"Tocqueville and Education"
January 15, 1998	Fayetteville, North Carolina	"Military and Democracy" – Featured discussion with Lieutenant General John M. Keane, commanding officer of Fort Bragg.
January 16, 1998	Norfolk, Virginia	"Military and Democracy" – Featured discussion with Rear Admiral Gordon Holder, commander of Amphibious Group Two.
January 19, 1998	Washington, D.C.	"Congress in the 19th Century" – Featured discussion with former Historian of the U.S. House of Representatives Raymond W. Smock.
January 19, 1998	Washington, D.C.	Discussion with Tocqueville interpreter Tim Lynch about his experiences portraying Tocqueville.
