= Rubber stamp (politics) =

Political metaphor

A rubber stamp is a political metaphor, referring to a person or institution that routinely approves matters brought before it. A rubber stamp may be an entity with considerable de jure power but little de facto power—one that rarely or never disagrees with more powerful organizations.

== Function ==
In situations where this superior official's signature may frequently be required for routine paperwork, a literal rubber stamp is used, with a likeness of their hand-written signature. In essence, the term is meant to convey an endorsement without careful thought or personal investment in the outcome, especially since it is usually expected as the stamper's duty to do so. In the situation where a dictator's legislature is a "rubber stamp", the orders they are meant to endorse are formalities they are expected to legitimize, and are usually done to create the superficial appearance of legislative and dictatorial harmony rather than because they have actual power.

In a constitutional monarchy or parliamentary republic, heads of state are typically "rubber stamps" (or figureheads) to an elected parliament, even if they legally possess considerable reserve powers or disagree with the parliament's decisions.

Rubber-stamp legislatures may occur even in democratic countries if the institutional arrangement allows for it.

== Examples ==
In many instances, the refusal of a constitutional monarch to rubber stamp laws passed by parliament can set off a constitutional crisis. For example, when then-king Baudouin of Belgium refused to sign a bill legalizing abortions in April 1990, the Belgian Federal Parliament declared him temporarily unable to reign. That effectively transferred his powers to the Cabinet for a single day, overriding his veto.

The FISA Courts in the United States, which are ex parte and have a low number of rejected warrants as compared to accepted warrants, has been said to have a rubber stamp by former NSA analyst Russ Tice.

=== Legislatures ===
One of the most famous examples of a rubber stamp institution is the Reichstag of Nazi Germany, which unanimously confirmed all decisions already made by Adolf Hitler and the highest-ranking members of the Nazi Party. Many legislatures of authoritarian and totalitarian countries are considered by political scientists as rubber stamps, such as communist parliaments like the Chinese National People's Congress, or the Italian Chamber of Fasces and Corporations during the Fascist regime.

Since the 2003 elections, Russia's Federal Assembly has been similarly referred to as a rubber stamp institution. Russia's State Duma (the lower house of the Federal Assembly) quickly adopted a number of laws proposed by the government without delay. The annexation of Crimea was quickly approved in 2014 with only one deputy, Ilya Ponomarev, voting against. During the Russian invasion of Ukraine, the legislative approvals of the annexation of occupied territories in late 2022 did not meet any resistance, giving the government full control.

Other suggested examples of rubber stamp legislatures include:

Historic legislatures

- Reichstag – Nazi Germany
- Chamber of Deputies, Chamber of Fasces and Corporations – Fascist Italy (1925–1943)
- Cortes Españolas – Francoist Spain
- Corporative Chamber – Estado Novo
- General Assembly – Ottoman Empire
- Estates General – Kingdom of France before the French Revolution
- Batasang Pambansa – Fourth Philippine Republic
- National Assembly – South Korea prior to democratization
- Legislative Yuan, Control Yuan and National Assembly – Republic of China on Taiwan under martial law and civil war
- National Assembly and Federal Assembly – Czechoslovak Socialist Republic
- Great National Assembly – Socialist Republic of Romania
- National Assembly – People's Republic of Bulgaria
- National Assembly – Hungarian People's Republic
- Sejm – Polish People's Republic
- Legislative Council – Zaire
- Congress of Soviets, Supreme Soviet – Soviet Union
- 2017 Constituent National Assembly – Venezuela
- Volkskammer – German Democratic Republic
- National Consultative Assembly – Imperial State of Iran after the 1953 coup
- Federal Senate – Brazil under military dictatorship between 1977 and 1985
- People's Assembly – Ba'athist Syria
- People's Parliaments – in the Baltic states in the early Soviet occupation of the Baltic states (1940)

Current legislatures

- Federal Assembly – Russia
- National Assembly – Belarus
- Parliament – Egypt
- Islamic Consultative Assembly and the Assembly of Experts (a deliberative body) are frequently characterized by observers as rubber stamps, though certain academic sources note that they hold elections that frequently produce results contrary to the preferences of the ruling elite — Iran
- Supreme People's Assembly – North Korea
- National People's Congress – China (Note: See references:)
  - Legislative Council of Hong Kong – Hong Kong
  - Legislative Assembly – Macau
- Chamber of Deputies – Rwanda
- National Assembly of People's Power – Cuba
- House of Assembly – Eswatini
- National Assembly – Vietnam
- National Assembly – Djibouti
- National Assembly – Laos
- Pyidaungsu Hluttaw - Myanmar

== See also ==
- Kangaroo court
- Rule by decree
