= Alexis de Tocqueville =

French diplomat, political philosopher and historian (1805–1859)

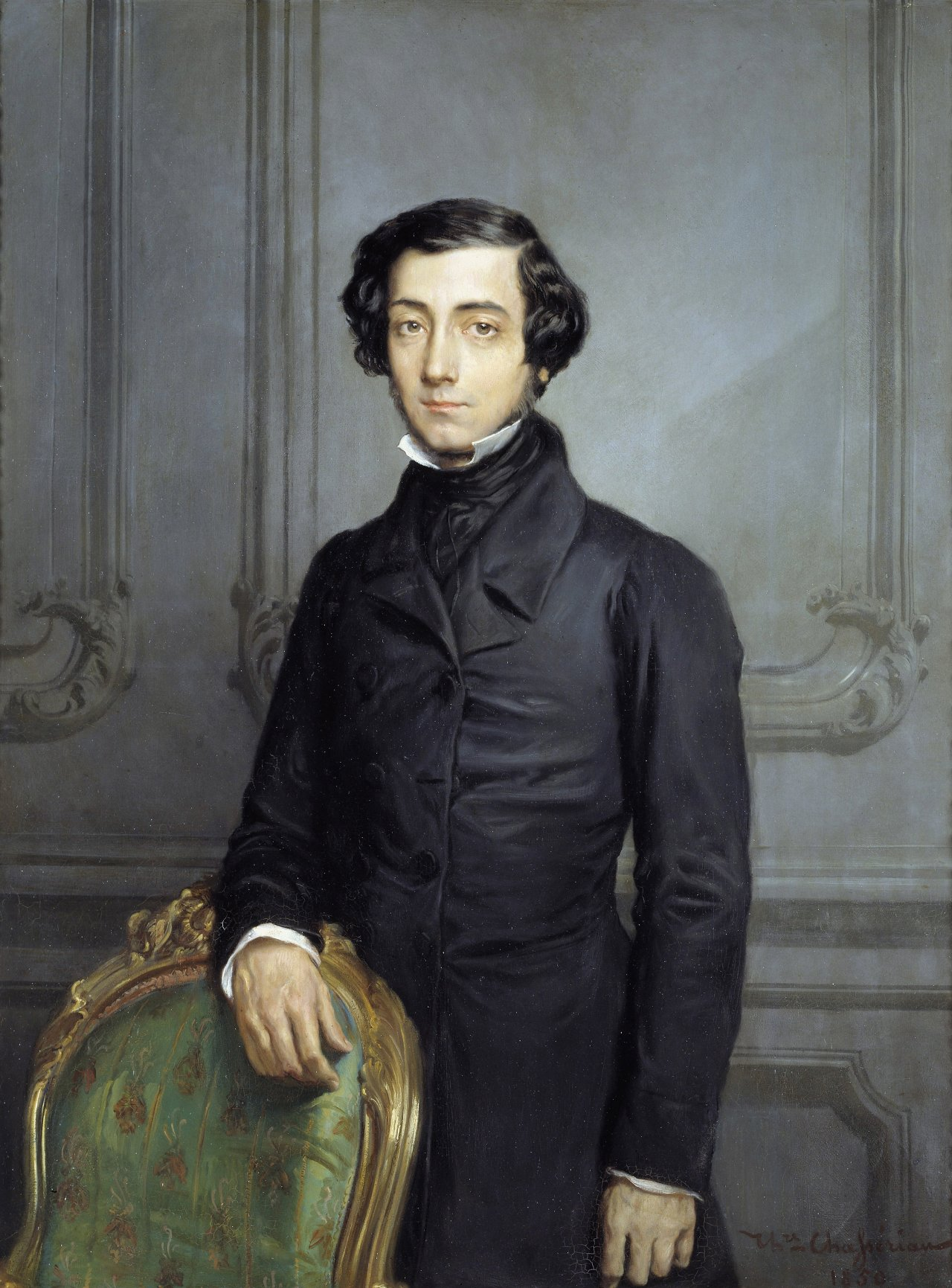
- Portrait of Alexis de Tocqueville by Théodore Chassériau, 1850

Minister of Foreign Affairs
- In office 18 March 1849 – 30 October 1849
- Prime Minister: Odilon Barrot
- Preceded by: Édouard Drouyn de Lhuys
- Succeeded by: Alphonse de Rayneval

President of the General Council of Manche
- In office 27 August 1849 – 29 April 1852
- Preceded by: Léonor-Joseph Havin
- Succeeded by: Urbain Le Verrier

Member of the National Assembly for Manche
- In office 25 April 1848 – 3 December 1851
- Preceded by: Léonor-Joseph Havin
- Succeeded by: Hervé de Kergorlay
- Constituency: Sainte-Mère-Église

Member of the Chamber of Deputies for Manche
- In office 7 March 1839 – 23 April 1848
- Preceded by: Jules Polydore Le Marois
- Succeeded by: Gabriel-Joseph Laumondais
- Constituency: Valognes

Personal details
- Born: Alexis Charles Henri Clérel de Tocqueville; 29 July 1805 Paris, France
- Died: 16 April 1859 (aged 53) Cannes, France
- Resting place: Tocqueville, Manche
- Party: Movement Party (1839–1848); Party of Order (1848–1851)
- Spouse: Mary Mottley (m. 1835)
- Education: University of Paris
- Profession: Historian, magistrate, jurist
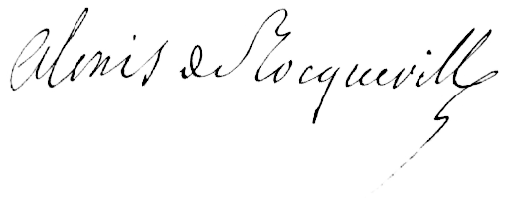
- Signature

Philosophical work
- Era: 19th-century philosophy
- Region: Western philosophy
- School: Liberalism; Liberal conservatism Conservative liberalism
- Main interests: History, political philosophy, sociology
- Notable works: Democracy in America (1835); The Old Regime and the Revolution (1856)
- Notable ideas: Voluntary association, mutual liberty, soft despotism, soft tyranny, Tocqueville effect

Alexis Charles Henri Clérel, comte de Tocqueville (Note: /ˈtɒkvɪl, ˈtoʊkvɪl/ TO(H)K-vil; French: [alɛksi də tɔkvil]) (29 July 1805 – 16 April 1859), was a French diplomat, political philosopher and historian. He is best known for his works Democracy in America (appearing in two volumes, 1835 and 1840) and The Old Regime and the Revolution (1856). In these, and in reflections on his travels in England and Ireland, he analyzed the living standards and social conditions of individuals as well as their relationship to the market and state in Western societies. Democracy in America was published after Tocqueville's travels in the United States and is today considered an early work of sociology and political science.

Tocqueville was active in French politics, first under the July Monarchy (1830–1848), during which he was considered the parliament's foremost expert on the French colonial project in Algeria, and then, following the 1848 Revolution, in the Second Republic (1849–1851). He retired from political life after Louis Napoléon Bonaparte's 2 December 1851 coup and thereafter began work on The Old Regime and the Revolution. Tocqueville argued the importance of the French Revolution was to continue the process of modernizing and centralizing the French state which had begun under King Louis XIV. He believed the failure of the Revolution came from the inexperience of the deputies who were too wedded to abstract Enlightenment ideals.

Tocqueville was a classical liberal who advocated parliamentary government and was sceptical of the extremes of majoritarianism. During his time in parliament, he was first a member of the centre-left before moving to the centre-right, and the complex and restless nature of his liberalism has led to contrasting interpretations and admirers across the political spectrum. For example, Democracy in America was interpreted differently across national contexts. In France and the United States, Tocqueville's work was seen as liberal, whereas both progressives and conservatives in the British Isles interpreted his work as supporting their own positions.

== Early life ==
Tocqueville came from an old aristocratic Norman family, the great-grandson of the statesman Malesherbes, who was guillotined in 1793. He was the third son of Hervé Louis François Jean Bonaventure Clérel, Count of Tocqueville, an officer of the Constitutional Guard of King Louis XVI, and Louise Madeleine Le Peletier de Rosanbo who, themselves, might have faced the guillotine but for the fall in 1794 of Maximilien Robespierre. Under the Bourbon Restoration, Tocqueville's father became a noble peer and prefect.

Tocqueville attended the Lycée Fabert in Metz. He continued his studies there until obtaining his baccalaureate in 1823. After graduating from high school, he obtained a law degree from the University of Paris in 1826.

== Political career ==
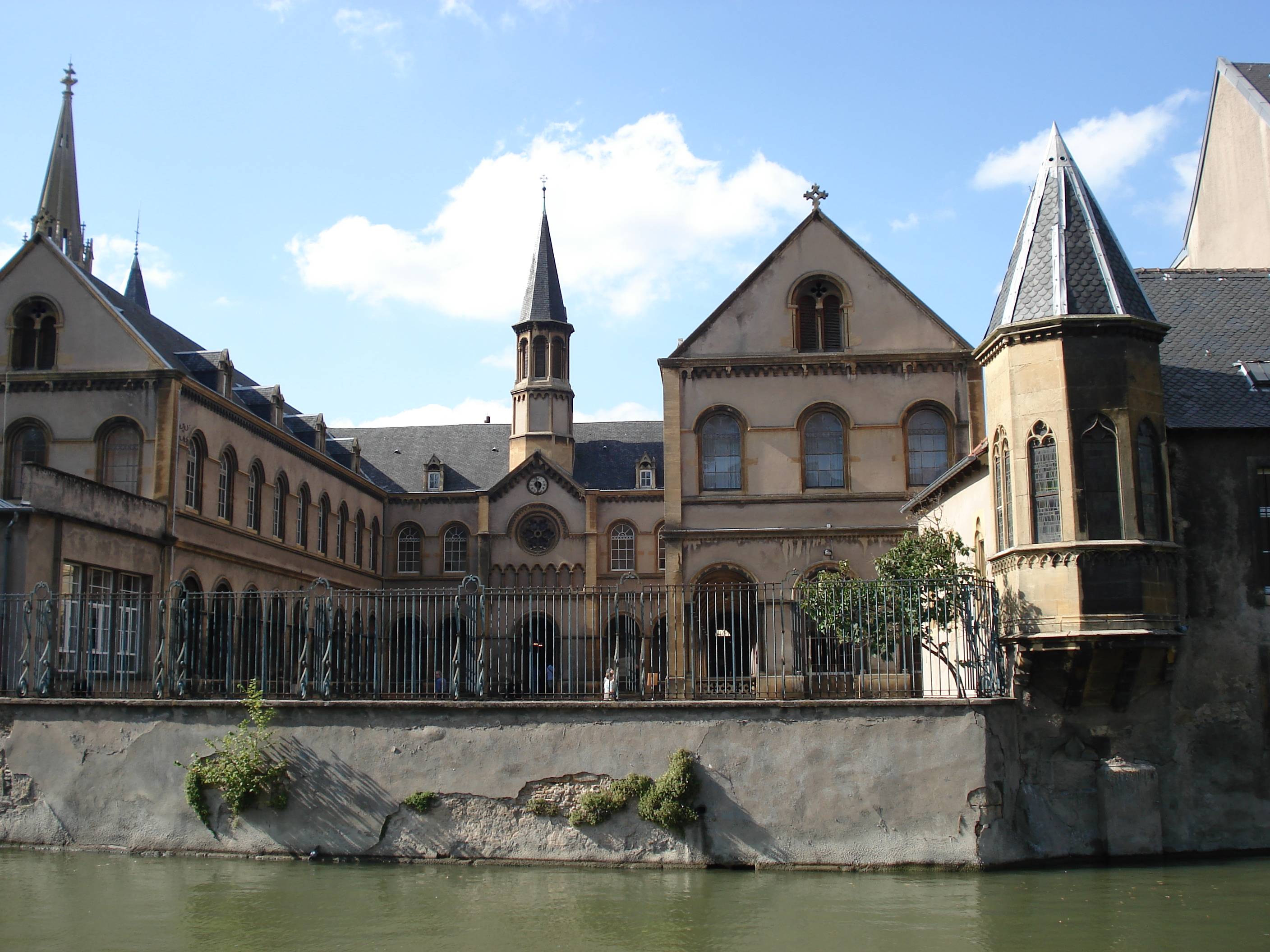
The Fabert School in Metz, where Tocqueville was a student between 1817 and 1823

Tocqueville, who despised the July Monarchy (1830–1848), began his political career in 1839. From 1839 to 1851, he served as member of the lower house of parliament for the Manche department (Valognes). He sat on the centre-left, defended abolitionist views and upheld free trade while supporting the colonisation of Algeria carried on by Louis-Philippe I's regime. In 1842, he was elected as a member of the American Philosophical Society.

In 1847, Tocqueville sought to found a Young Left (Jeune Gauche) party which would advocate wage increases, a progressive tax, and other labor concerns in order to undermine the appeal of the socialists.

=== In the Second Republic ===
After the fall of the July Monarchy in the Revolution of 1848, Tocqueville was elected a member of the Constituent Assembly of 1848, where he became a member of the commission charged with the drafting of the new Constitution of the Second Republic (1848–1851). He defended bicameralism and the election of the President of the Republic by universal suffrage. As the countryside was thought to be more conservative than the labouring population of Paris, he conceived of universal suffrage as a means to counteract the revolutionary spirit of Paris.

During the Second Republic, Tocqueville sided with the Party of Order against the socialists. A few days after the February 1848 insurrection, he anticipated that a violent clash between the Parisian workers' population led by socialists agitating in favour of a "Democratic and Social Republic" and the conservatives, which included the aristocracy and the rural population, would be inescapable. Indeed, these social tensions eventually exploded in the June Days Uprising of 1848.

Led by General Cavaignac, the suppression of the uprising was supported by Tocqueville, who advocated the "regularization" of the state of siege declared by Cavaignac and other measures promoting suspension of the constitutional order. Between May and September, Tocqueville participated in the Constitutional Commission which wrote the new Constitution. His proposals, such as his amendment about the President and his reelection, reflected lessons he drew from his North American experience.

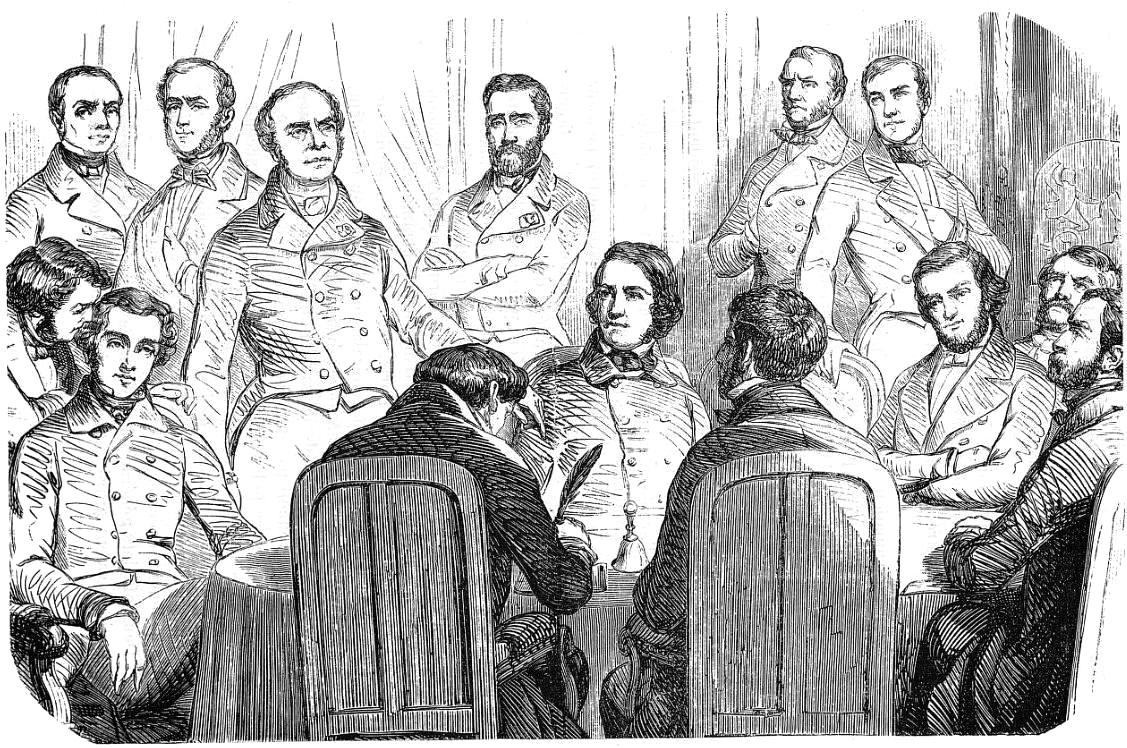
Tocqueville at the 1851 "Commission de la révision de la Constitution à l'Assemblée nationale"

A supporter of Cavaignac and of the Party of Order, Tocqueville accepted an invitation to enter Odilon Barrot's government as Minister of Foreign Affairs from 3 June to 31 October 1849. During the troubled days of June 1849, he pleaded with Interior Minister Jules Armand Dufaure for the reestablishment of the state of siege in the capital and approved the arrest of demonstrators. Tocqueville, who since February 1848 had supported laws restricting political freedoms, approved the two laws voted immediately after the June 1849 days which restricted the liberty of clubs and freedom of the press.

This active support in favour of laws restricting political freedoms stands in contrast of his defence of freedoms in Democracy in America. According to Tocqueville, he favoured order as "the sine qua non for the conduct of serious politics. He [hoped] to bring the kind of stability to French political life that would permit the steady growth of liberty unimpeded by the regular rumblings of the earthquakes of revolutionary change″.

=== Opposition to Louis Napoleon ===
Tocqueville had supported Cavaignac against Louis Napoléon Bonaparte for the presidential election of 1848. Opposed to Louis Napoléon Bonaparte's 2 December 1851 coup which followed his election, Tocqueville was among the deputies who gathered at the 10th arrondissement of Paris in an attempt to resist the coup and have Napoleon III judged for "high treason" as he had violated the constitutional limit on terms of office. Detained at Vincennes and then released, Tocqueville, who supported the Restoration of the Bourbons against Napoleon III's Second Empire (1851–1871), quit political life and retreated to his castle (Château de Tocqueville).

Against this image of Tocqueville, biographer Joseph Epstein concluded: "Tocqueville could never bring himself to serve a man he considered a usurper and despot. He fought as best he could for the political liberty in which he so ardently believed—had given it, in all, thirteen years of his life ... . He would spend the days remaining to him fighting the same fight, but conducting it now from libraries, archives, and his own desk." There, he began the draft of L'Ancien Régime et la Révolution, publishing the first tome in 1856 but leaving the second one unfinished.

== Travels ==
=== North America ===
In 1831, Tocqueville obtained from the July Monarchy a mission to examine prisons and penitentiaries in the United States and proceeded there with his lifelong friend Gustave de Beaumont. While they did visit some prisons, Tocqueville and Beaumont traveled widely in the United States: from the east-coast cities to what was then the north-west frontier, Michigan; by steamboat down the Ohio and Mississippi to New Orleans; and by stagecoach across the South back toward the east coast and north to New York. Tocqueville also made a side trip to Montreal and Quebec City. Throughout his trip, he took extensive notes on his observations and reflections. He returned within nine months and published a report, The Penitentiary System in the United States, although the more well-known result of his tour was his major work Democracy in America, which appeared in 1835. Meanwhile for Beaumont, their joint travels were the inspiration for a work of romantic fiction. In Jacksonian America: Marie or Slavery in the United States (1835), an essay on race is interwoven with a tale of forbidden love between an idealistic young French traveler and Marie, an American woman who appears white but discovers she has African ancestry.

=== England and Ireland ===
Tocqueville returned to France in February 1832. Before putting the finishing touches to his reflections on American democracy, he departed for England in 1833. Tocqueville had a private reason for crossing the Channel: to meet the family of Mary Mottley, a young woman he had met at Versailles. The couple were married in 1836. He stayed five weeks in England, eager to observe what many imagined as the dawning of the age of democracy, the passage of the Parliamentary Reform Act. Tocqueville concluded that there was "a good chance for the English to succeed in modifying the social and political set-up ... without violent convulsions". The British nobility was open to new recruits. He suggested that the difference with the French was "clear from the use of one word" as "gentleman in English applies to any well-educated man, regardless of birth, whereas in France gentilhomme can only be used of a noble by birth".

In May 1835, Tocqueville returned to England but then in summer with Beaumont travelled on to Ireland, then part of the United Kingdom of Great Britain and Ireland. He described Ireland as having "all the evils of an aristocracy and none of its advantages". There was "no moral tie between rich and poor; the difference of political opinion of religious belief and the actual distance they live apart make them strangers one to the other, one could almost say enemies". In this circumstance he remarked on the "unbelievable unity between the Irish clergy and the Catholic population". The people looked to the clergy, and the clergy "rebuffed" by the "upper classes" ("Protestants and enemies"), had "turned all its attention to the lower classes; it has the same instincts, the same interests and the same passions as the people; [a] state of affairs altogether peculiar to Ireland".

Back in England, Tocqueville found confirmation of a close connection between centralisation and democratisation. He observed that in England centralisation took a form less absolute than in France. It was of "legislation and not administration", and co-existed with a "spirit of [civic] association" that in responding to specific and local issues narrowed the range of government intervention. Tocqueville had intended the joint impressions of their trip to Britain and Ireland would form the basis of a work by Beaumont, just as their common reflections of the United States on had served as him as material for Democracy in America. Beaumont did produce L'Irlande sociale, politique et religieuse (1839). Much praised by Daniel O'Connell, the first sentence of its historical introduction read: "The dominion of the English in Ireland, from their invasion of the country in 1169, to the close of the last century, has been nothing but a tyranny."

=== Algeria ===
In 1841 and 1846, Tocqueville traveled to Algeria which France had invaded and colonised from 1830. Having himself entertained the possibility of settling in Algeria as a colonist, from his election to the Chamber of Deputies in 1839 Tocqueville had come to be seen as the parliament's foremost expert on the colony. In 1837, he had written of his hope for eventual intermarriage between the French and indigenous Arabs and their amalgamation into a distinct whole. Following the first of his two visits to Algeria (again accompanied by Beaumont), his position was reversed. When it came to the French colonists, he "displayed his usual liberalism", as he criticised the "coarseness and violence" of the military rule to which they too were subject. Yet from what he observed of Algerian society, including what he understood as "the absence of all political life", he was persuaded that not only could its violent subjugation be justified but also that its result could not, and should never, be assimilation of the indigenous people into the civil and political life of France.

== Death ==
A longtime sufferer from bouts of tuberculosis, Tocqueville eventually succumbed to the disease on 16 April 1859 and was buried in the Tocqueville cemetery in Normandy. He was survived by his English wife of 23 years, Mary Mottley. Although she was "too liberal ... too Protestant, too middle-class, and too English" for some in his family, de Tocqueville described Mottley as perhaps his only true friend. While they had hoped for a family, they had no children.

In advance of their marriage, Mottley converted to Roman Catholicism, Tocqueville's professed religion. While she appeared to be comparatively devout, Tocqueville's own attitude toward religion has been described as "utilitarian", regarding it as a "social cement, a safety valve for passions that might otherwise feed a revolutionary torrent dangerous to individual liberty". Provided it was separated from state power, Tocqueville did not believe that his church was bound to be anti-democratic.

== Democracy in America ==
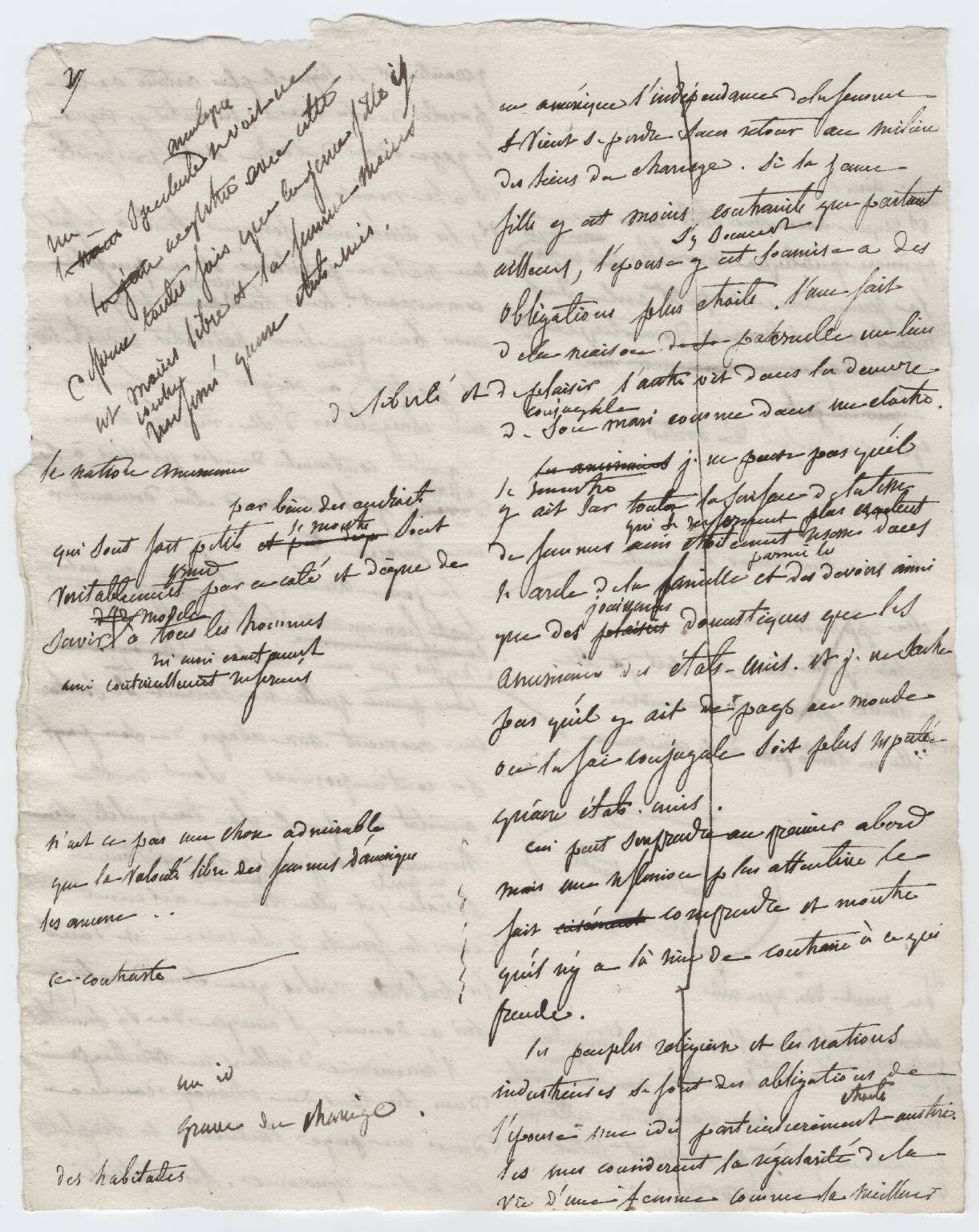
A page from original working manuscript of Democracy in America, c. 1840

In Democracy in America, published in 1835, Tocqueville wrote of the New World and its burgeoning democratic order. Observing from the perspective of a detached social scientist, Tocqueville wrote of his travels through the United States in the early 19th century when the Market Revolution, Western expansion and Jacksonian democracy were radically transforming the fabric of American life.

According to political scientist Joshua Kaplan, one purpose of writing Democracy in America was to help the people of France get a better understanding of their position between a fading aristocratic order and an emerging democratic order and to help them sort out the confusion. Tocqueville saw democracy as an enterprise that balanced liberty and equality, concern for the individual as well as for the community. On a negative note, Tocqueville remarked that "in democracies manners are never so refined as amongst aristocratic nations."

Tocqueville was an ardent supporter of liberty. He wrote: "I have a passionate love for liberty, law, and respect for rights. I am neither of the revolutionary party nor of the conservative. ... Liberty is my foremost passion." He wrote of "Political Consequences of the Social State of the Anglo-Americans" by saying: "But one also finds in the human heart a depraved taste for equality, which impels the weak to want to bring the strong down to their level, and which reduces men to preferring equality in servitude to inequality in freedom."

The above is often misquoted as a slavery quote because of previous translations of the French text. The most recent translation by Arthur Goldhammer in 2004 translates the meaning to be as stated above. Examples of misquoted sources are numerous on the internet such as "Americans are so enamored of equality that they would rather be equal in slavery than unequal in freedom", but the text does not contain the words "Americans were so enamored by equality" anywhere.

His view on government reflects his belief in liberty and the need for individuals to be able to act freely while respecting others' rights. Of centralized government, he wrote that it "excels in preventing, not doing". Tocqueville continues to comment on equality by saying: "Furthermore, when citizens are all almost equal, it becomes difficult for them to defend their independence against the aggressions of power. As none of them is strong enough to fight alone with advantage, the only guarantee of liberty is for everyone to combine forces. But such a combination is not always in evidence".

Tocqueville explicitly cites inequality as being incentive for the poor to become rich. He observes that it is not often that two generations within a family maintain success, and considers inheritance laws which divide a person's estate among multiple heirs to cause a constant cycle of churn between the poor and the rich, thereby over generations making the poor rich and the rich poor. He cites protective laws in France at the time that protected an estate from being split apart among heirs, thereby preserving wealth and preventing a churn of wealth such as was perceived by him in 1835 within the United States.

=== On civil and political society and the individual ===
Tocqueville's main purpose was to analyze the functioning of political society and various forms of political associations, although he brought some reflections on civil society too (and relations between political and civil society). For Tocqueville, as for Georg Wilhelm Friedrich Hegel and Karl Marx, civil society was a sphere of private entrepreneurship and civilian affairs regulated by civil code. As a critic of individualism, Tocqueville thought that through associating for mutual purpose, both in public and private, Americans are able to overcome selfish desires, thus making both a self-conscious and active political society and a vibrant civil society functioning according to political and civil laws of the state.

According to political scientist Joshua Kaplan, Tocqueville did not originate the concept of individualism, instead he changed its meaning and saw it as a "calm and considered feeling which disposes each citizen to isolate himself from the mass of his fellows and to withdraw into the circle of family and friends ... . [W]ith this little society formed to his taste, he gladly leaves the greater society to look for itself." While Tocqueville saw egotism and selfishness as vices, he saw individualism not as a failure of feeling but as a way of thinking about things which could have either positive consequences such as a willingness to work together, or negative consequences such as isolation and that individualism could be remedied by improved understanding.

When individualism was a positive force and prompted people to work together for common purposes and seen as "self-interest properly understood", then it helped to counterbalance the danger of the tyranny of the majority since people could "take control over their own lives" without government aid. According to Kaplan, Americans have a difficult time accepting Tocqueville's criticism of the stifling intellectual effect of the "omnipotence of the majority" and that Americans tend to deny that there is a problem in this regard. Others such as the Catholic writer Daniel Schwindt disagree with Kaplan's interpretation, arguing instead that Tocqueville saw individualism as just another form of egotism and not an improvement over it. To make his case, Schwindt provides citations such as the following:

Egoism springs from a blind instinct; individualism from wrong-headed thinking rather than from depraved feelings. It originates as much from defects of intelligence as from the mistakes of the heart. Egoism blights the seeds of every virtue; individualism at first dries up only the source of public virtue. In the longer term it attacks and destroys all the others and will finally merge with egoism.

=== On democracy and new forms of tyranny ===
Tocqueville warned that modern democracy may be adept at inventing new forms of tyranny because radical equality could lead to the materialism of an expanding bourgeoisie and to the selfishness of individualism. "In such conditions, we might become so enamored with 'a relaxed love of present enjoyments' that we lose interest in the future of our descendants...and meekly allow ourselves to be led in ignorance by a despotic force all the more powerful because it does not resemble one", wrote The New Yorker's James Wood. Tocqueville worried that if despotism were to take root in a modern democracy, it would be a much more dangerous version than the oppression under the Roman emperors or tyrants of the past who could only exert a pernicious influence on a small group of people at a time.

In contrast, a despotism under a democracy could see "a multitude of men", uniformly alike, equal, "constantly circling for petty pleasures", unaware of fellow citizens and subject to the will of a powerful state which exerted an "immense protective power". Tocqueville compared a potentially despotic democratic government to a protective parent who wants to keep its citizens (children) as "perpetual children" and which does not break men's wills but rather guides it and presides over people in the same way as a shepherd looking after a "flock of timid animals".

=== On the American social contract ===
Tocqueville's penetrating analysis sought to understand the peculiar nature of American political life. In describing the American, he agreed with thinkers such as Aristotle and Montesquieu that the balance of property determined the balance of political power; however, his conclusions differed radically from those of his predecessors. Tocqueville tried to understand why the United States was so different from Europe in the last throes of aristocracy. In contrast to the aristocratic ethic, the United States was a society where hard work and money-making was the dominant ethic, where the common man enjoyed a level of dignity which was unprecedented, where commoners never deferred to elites and where what he described as crass individualism and market capitalism had taken root to an extraordinary degree.

Tocqueville writes: "Among a democratic people, where there is no hereditary wealth, every man works to earn a living. ... Labor is held in honor; the prejudice is not against but in its favor." Tocqueville asserted that the values that had triumphed in the North and were present in the South had begun to suffocate old-world ethics and social arrangements. Legislatures abolished primogeniture and entails, resulting in more widely distributed land holdings. This was a contrast to the general aristocratic pattern in which only the eldest child, usually a man, inherited the estate, which had the effect of keeping large estates intact from generation to generation.

In contrast, landed elites in the United States were less likely to pass on fortunes to a single child by the action of primogeniture, which meant that as time went by large estates became broken up within a few generations which in turn made the children more equal overall. According to Joshua Kaplan's Tocqueville, it was not always a negative development since bonds of affection and shared experience between children often replaced the more formal relation between the eldest child and the siblings, characteristic of the previous aristocratic pattern. Overall, hereditary fortunes in the new democracies became exceedingly difficult to secure and more people were forced to struggle for their own living.

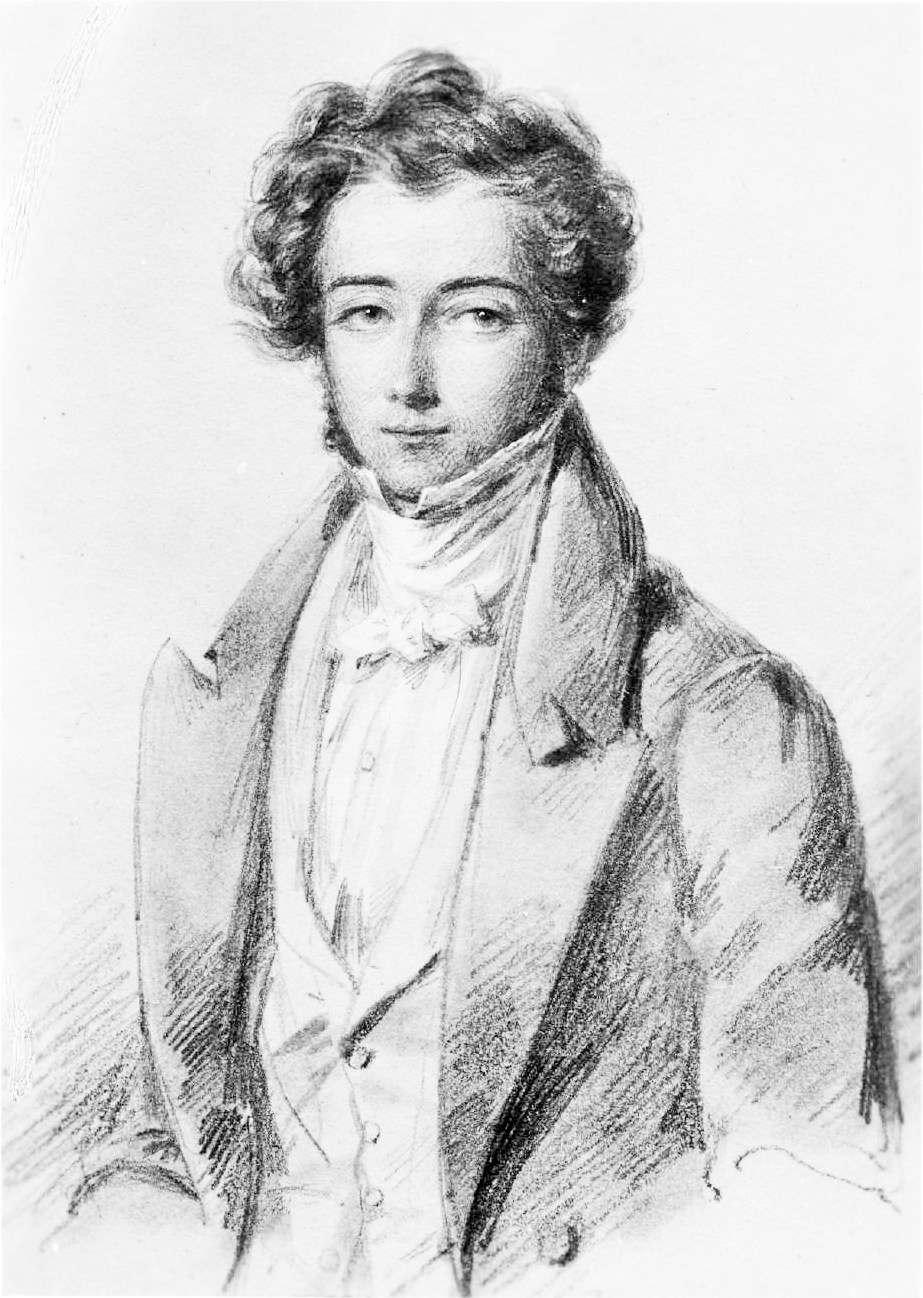
A sketch of Tocqueville

As Tocqueville understood it, this rapidly democratizing society had a population devoted to "middling" values which wanted to amass through hard work vast fortunes. In Tocqueville's mind, this explained why the United States was so different from Europe. In Europe, he claimed, nobody cared about making money. The lower classes had no hope of gaining more than minimal wealth while the upper classes found it crass, vulgar and unbecoming of their sort to care about something as unseemly as money and many were virtually guaranteed wealth and took it for granted. At the same time in the United States, workers would see people fashioned in exquisite attire and merely proclaim that through hard work they too would soon possess the fortune necessary to enjoy such luxuries.

=== On majority rule and mediocrity ===
Beyond the eradication of old-world aristocracy, ordinary Americans also refused to defer to those possessing, as Tocqueville put it, superior talent and intelligence, and these natural elites could not enjoy much share in political power as a result. Ordinary Americans enjoyed too much power and claimed too great a voice in the public sphere to defer to intellectual superiors. Tocqueville argued that this culture promoted a relatively pronounced equality, but the same mores and opinions that ensured such equality also promoted mediocrity. Those who possessed true virtue and talent were left with limited choices.

Tocqueville said that those with the most education and intelligence were left with two choices. They could join limited intellectual circles to explore the weighty and complex problems facing society, or they could use their superior talents to amass vast fortunes in the private sector. He wrote that he did not know of any country where there was "less independence of mind, and true freedom of discussion, than in America".

Tocqueville blamed the omnipotence of majority rule as a chief factor in stifling thinking: "The majority has enclosed thought within a formidable fence. A writer is free inside that area, but woe to the man who goes beyond it, not that he stands in fear of an inquisition, but he must face all kinds of unpleasantness in every day persecution. A career in politics is closed to him for he has offended the only power that holds the keys." According to Kaplan's interpretation of Tocqueville, he argued in contrast to previous political thinkers that a serious problem in political life was not that people were too strong but that people were "too weak" and felt "swept up in something that they could not control".

=== On enslavement, black people, and indigenous communities ===
Uniquely positioned at a crossroads in American history, Tocqueville's Democracy in America attempted to capture the essence of American culture and values. Although a supporter of colonialism, Tocqueville could clearly perceive the evils that black people and natives had been subjected to in the United States. Tocqueville devoted the last chapter of the first volume of Democracy in America to the question, while his travel companion Gustave de Beaumont wholly focused on slavery and its fallouts for the American nation in Marie or Slavery in America. Tocqueville observes among the American races:

The first who attracts the eye, the first in enlightenment, in power and in happiness, is the white man, the European, man par excellence; below him appear the Negro and the Indian. These two unfortunate races have neither birth, nor face, nor language, nor mores in common; only their misfortunes look alike. Both occupy an equally inferior position in the country that they inhabit; both experience the effects of tyranny; and if their miseries are different, they can accuse the same author for them.

Tocqueville contrasted the settlers of Virginia with the middle class, religious Puritans who founded New England and analyzed the debasing influence of slavery:

The men sent to Virginia were seekers of gold, adventurers without resources and without character, whose turbulent and restless spirit endangered the infant colony. ... Artisans and agriculturalists arrived afterwards[,] ... hardly in any respect above the level of the inferior classes in England. No lofty views, no spiritual conception presided over the foundation of these new settlements. The colony was scarcely established when slavery was introduced; this was the capital fact which was to exercise an immense influence on the character, the laws and the whole future of the South. Slavery ... dishonors labor; it introduces idleness into society, and with idleness, ignorance and pride, luxury and distress. It enervates the powers of the mind and benumbs the activity of man. On this same English foundation there developed in the North very different characteristics.

Tocqueville maintained that the friction between races in America was deeper than merely the issue of slavery, even going so far as to say that discrimination against African Americans was worse in states where slavery was outlawed:

Whosoever has inhabited the United States must have perceived that in those parts of the Union in which the negroes are no longer slaves, they have in no wise drawn nearer to the whites. On the contrary, the prejudice of the race appears to be stronger in the States which have abolished slavery, than in those where it still exists; and nowhere is it so intolerant as in those States where servitude has never been known.

Tocqueville concluded that return of the Black population to Africa could not resolve the problem, as he writes at the end of Democracy in America:

If the colony of Liberia were able to receive thousands of new inhabitants every year, and if the Negroes were in a state to be sent thither with advantage; if the Union were to supply the society with annual subsidies, and to transport the Negroes to Africa in government vessels, it would still be unable to counterpoise the natural increase of population among the blacks; and as it could not remove as many men in a year as are born upon its territory within that time, it could not prevent the growth of the evil which is daily increasing in the states. The Negro race will never leave those shores of the American continent to which it was brought by the passions and the vices of Europeans; and it will not disappear from the New World as long as it continues to exist. The inhabitants of the United States may retard the calamities which they apprehend, but they cannot now destroy their efficient cause.

In 1855, Tocqueville wrote the following text published by Maria Weston Chapman in the Liberty Bell: Testimony against Slavery:

I do not think it is for me, a foreigner, to indicate to the United States the time, the measures, or the men by whom Slavery shall be abolished. Still, as the persevering enemy of despotism everywhere, and under all its forms, I am pained and astonished by the fact that the freest people in the world is, at the present time, almost the only one among civilized and Christian nations which yet maintains personal servitude; and this while serfdom itself is about disappearing, where it has not already disappeared, from the most degraded nations of Europe.

An old and sincere friend of America, I am uneasy at seeing Slavery retard her progress, tarnish her glory, furnish arms to her detractors, compromise the future career of the Union which is the guaranty of her safety and greatness, and point out beforehand to her, to all her enemies, the spot where they are to strike. As a man, too, I am moved at the spectacle of man's degradation by man, and I hope to see the day when the law will grant equal civil liberty to all the inhabitants of the same empire, as God accords the freedom of the will, without distinction, to the dwellers upon earth.

French historian of colonialism Olivier Le Cour Grandmaison argues that Tocqueville (along with Jules Michelet) was ahead of his time in his use of the term "extermination" to describe what was happening during the colonization of Western United States and the Indian removal period.

=== On policies of assimilation ===
According to Tocqueville, assimilation of black people would be almost impossible, as was already being demonstrated in the Northern states; however, assimilation was the best solution for Native Americans, and since they were too proud to assimilate, they would inevitably become extinct. Displacement was another part of America's Indian policy. Both populations were "undemocratic", or without the qualities, intellectual and otherwise, needed to live in a democracy. Tocqueville shared many views on assimilation and segregation of his and the coming epochs but opposed Arthur de Gobineau's theories as found in An Essay on the Inequality of the Human Races (1853–1855).

=== On the United States and Russia as future global powers ===
In his Democracy in America, Tocqueville also forecast the preeminence of the United States and Russia as the two main global powers. In his book, he stated: "There are now two great nations in the world, which starting from different points, seem to be advancing toward the same goal: the Russians and the Anglo-Americans. ... Each seems called by some secret design of Providence one day to hold in its hands the destinies of half the world."

=== On civil jury service ===
Tocqueville believed that the American jury system was particularly important in educating citizens in self-government and rule of law. He often expressed how the civil jury system was one of the most effective showcases of democracy because it connected citizens with the true spirit of the justice system. In his 1835 treatise Democracy in America, he explained: "The jury, and more especially the civil jury, serves to communicate the spirit of the judges to the minds of all the citizens; and this spirit, with the habits which attend it, is the soundest preparation for free institutions. ... It invests each citizen with a kind of magistracy; it makes them all feel the duties which they are bound to discharge toward society; and the part which they take in the Government."

Tocqueville believed that jury service not only benefited the society as a whole but also enhanced jurors' qualities as citizens. Because of the jury system, "they were better informed about the rule of law, and they were more closely connected to the state. Thus, quite independently of what the jury contributed to dispute resolution, participation on the jury had salutary effects on the jurors themselves."

== Views on Algeria ==
Alexis de Tocqueville was an important figure in the colonization of Algeria. A member of French parliament during the French conquest of Algeria and subsequent July Monarchy, Tocqueville took it upon himself to become an expert on the Algeria question, and to this end penned a number of discourses and letters. He also made a point of studying Islam, the Quran, and the Arabic language, in order to better understand the country.

=== 1837 letters on Algeria ===
In a series of letters penned by Alexis de Tocqueville, he describes the situation of France as well as the geography and society of Algeria at the time.

"Suppose that the Emperor of China, landing in France at the head of an armed power, should make himself master of our largest cities and of our capital. That after having burned all the public registers before suffering to read them, and having destroyed or dispersed all of the civil service without inquiring into their various attributions, he should finally seize every functionary – from the head of the government to the campesino guards, the peers, the deputies, and in general the whole ruling class – and deport them all at once to some distant country. Do you not think that this great prince, in spite of his powerful army, his fortresses and his treasures, will soon find himself extremely unprepared in administering the conquered country; that his new subjects, deprived of all those who conducted or could conduct affairs of state, will be unable to govern themselves, while he, coming from the antipodes, knows neither the religion, nor the language, nor the laws, nor the habits, nor the administrative customs of the country, and who has taken care to remove all those who could have instructed him in them, will be in no state rule them. You will therefore have no difficulty in foreseeing that if the parts of France which are materially occupied by the victor obey him, the rest of the country will soon be given over to an immense anarchy."

Despite being initially critical of the French invasion of Algeria, Tocqueville also believed that geopolitical necessities of the time would not allow for a withdrawal of military forces for two reasons: first, his understanding of the international situation and France's position in the world; and second, changes in French society. Tocqueville believed that war and colonization would "restore national pride; threatened", he believed, by "the gradual softening of social mores" in the middle classes. Their taste for "material pleasures" was spreading to the whole of society, giving it "an example of weakness and egotism".

=== 1841 discourse on the conquest of Algeria ===
Tocqueville expressed himself in an 1841 essay concerning the conquest of Algeria in which he called for a dual program of "domination" and "colonization".

For my part, I have brought back from Africa the distressing notion that at the moment we are waging war in a much more barbaric manner than the Arabs themselves. At present, theirs is the side of civilization. This way of waging war seems to me as stupid as it is cruel. It can only enter into the crude and brutal mind of a soldier. It was not worth putting displacing the Turks to reproduce that which in them deserved the detestation of the world. That, even from the point of view of interest, is much more harmful than useful; because, as another officer said to me, if we only aim to equal the Turks we will be by the fact in a position much lower than them: barbarians among barbarians, the Turks will always have on us the advantage of being Muslim barbarians. It is thus to a principle superior to theirs that we must appeal.

I have often heard in France men whom I respect, but whom I do not agree with, say that it wrong to burn the harvests, to empty the silos and finally to imprison unarmed men, women and children. These are, in my opinion, unfortunate necessities, but ones to which any people who want to make war on the Arabs will be obliged to submit. And, if I must say what I think, these acts do not revolt me more or even as much as several others which the law of war obviously authorizes and which take place in all the wars of Europe. Why is it more odious to burn harvests and take women and children prisoner than to bombard the harmless population of a besieged city or to seize merchant ships belonging to the subjects of an enemy power at sea? The one is, in my opinion, much crueler and less justifiable than the other.

Applauding the methods of General Bugeaud, Tocqueville went so far to claim that "war in Africa is a science. Everyone is familiar with its rules and everyone can apply those rules with almost complete certainty of success. One of the greatest services that Field Marshal Bugeaud has rendered his country is to have spread, perfected and made everyone aware of this new science." Tocqueville advocated racial segregation as a form of consociationalism in Algeria with two distinct legislations, one for European colonists and one for the Arab population.

Without doubt, it would be as dangerous as it would be useless to try to suggest to them our morals, our ideas, our customs. It is not in the direction of our European civilization that we must now push them, but in the direction of their own civilization; we must ask of them what they desire and not what they despise. Individual property, industry, sedentary living are not contrary to the religion of Mohammed. Arabs have known or know these things elsewhere; they are appreciated and enjoyed by some of them in Algeria itself. Why should we despair of making them familiar to the greatest number? It has already been attempted on some points with success. Islam is not absolutely impenetrable to the Enlightenment; it has often admitted in its bosom certain sciences or certain arts. Why should we not try to make these flourish under our empire? Let us not force the natives to come to our schools, but let us help them to raise theirs, to multiply those who teach there, to train the men of law and the men of religion, of whom the Muslim civilization cannot do without any more than us.

Such a two-tier arrangement would be fully realised with the 1870 Crémieux decree and the Indigenousness Code, which extended French citizenship to European settlers and Algerian Jews whereas Muslim Algerians would be governed under the Code de l'indigénat; however Tocqueville hoped for an eventual mixing of the French and Arab populations into a single body:

Every day the French are developing clearer and more accurate notions about the inhabitants of Algeria. They learn their languages, become familiar with their customs, and one even sees some who show a kind of unthinking enthusiasm for them. On the other hand, the whole of the young Arab generation in Algiers speaks our language and has already taken on some of our customs. ... There is therefore no reason to believe that time cannot succeed in amalgamating the two races. God does not prevent it; only the faults of men could impede it.

=== Opposition to the invasion of Kabylia ===
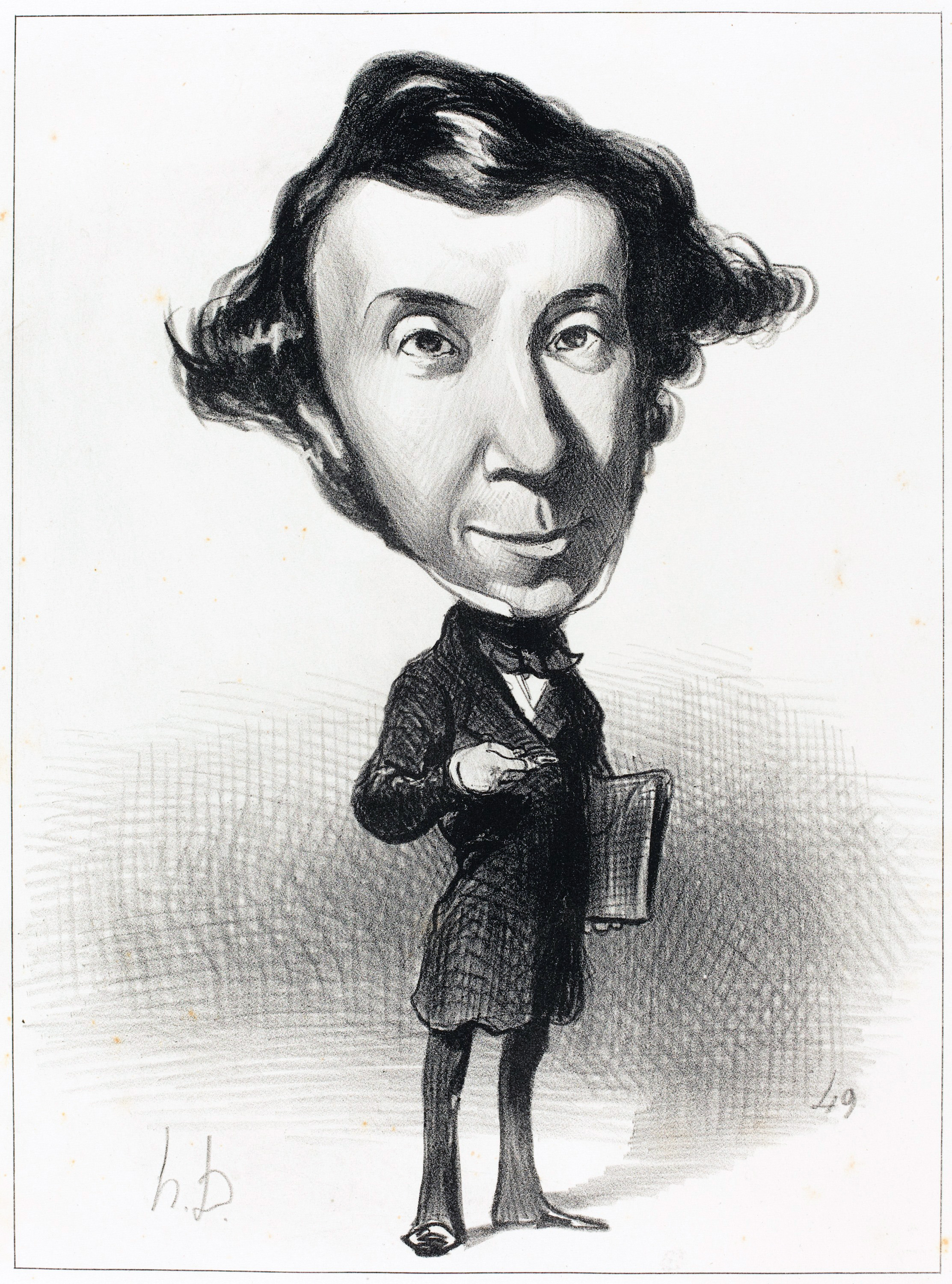
1849 caricature by Honoré Daumier

In opposition to Olivier Le Cour Grandmaison, Jean-Louis Benoît said that given the extent of racial prejudices during the colonization of Algeria, Tocqueville was one of its "most moderate supporters". Benoît said that it was wrong to assume Tocqueville was a supporter of Bugeaud despite his 1841 apologetic discourse. It seems that Tocqueville modified his views after his second visit to Algeria in 1846 as he criticized Bugeaud's desire to invade Kabylia in an 1847 speech to the Assembly. Although Tocqueville had favoured retention of distinct traditional law, administrators, schools and so on for Arabs who had come under French control, he compared the Berber tribes of Kabylia (in his second of Two Letters on Algeria, 1837) to Rousseau's concept of the "noble savage", stating:

If Rousseau had known the Kabyles ... he would not have spouted so much nonsense about the Caribbean and other American Indians: He would have looked to the Atlas for his models; there he would have found men who are subject to a kind of social police and yet almost as free as the isolated individual who enjoys his wild independence in the depths of the woods; men who are neither rich nor poor, neither servants nor masters; who appoint their own chiefs, and scarcely notice that they have chiefs, who are content with their state and remain in it

Tocqueville's views on the matter were complex. Although in his 1841 report on Algeria he applauded Bugeaud for making war in a way that defeated Abd-el-Kader's resistance, he had advocated in the Two Letters that the French military advance leave Kabylia undisturbed and in subsequent speeches and writings he continued to oppose intrusion into Kabylia. In the debate about the 1846 extraordinary funds, Tocqueville denounced Bugeaud's conduct of military operations and succeeded in convincing the Assembly not to vote funds in support of Bugeaud's military columns. Tocqueville considered Bugeaud's plan to invade Kabylia despite the opposition of the Assembly as a seditious act in the face of which the government was opting for cowardice.

=== 1847 "Report on Algeria" ===
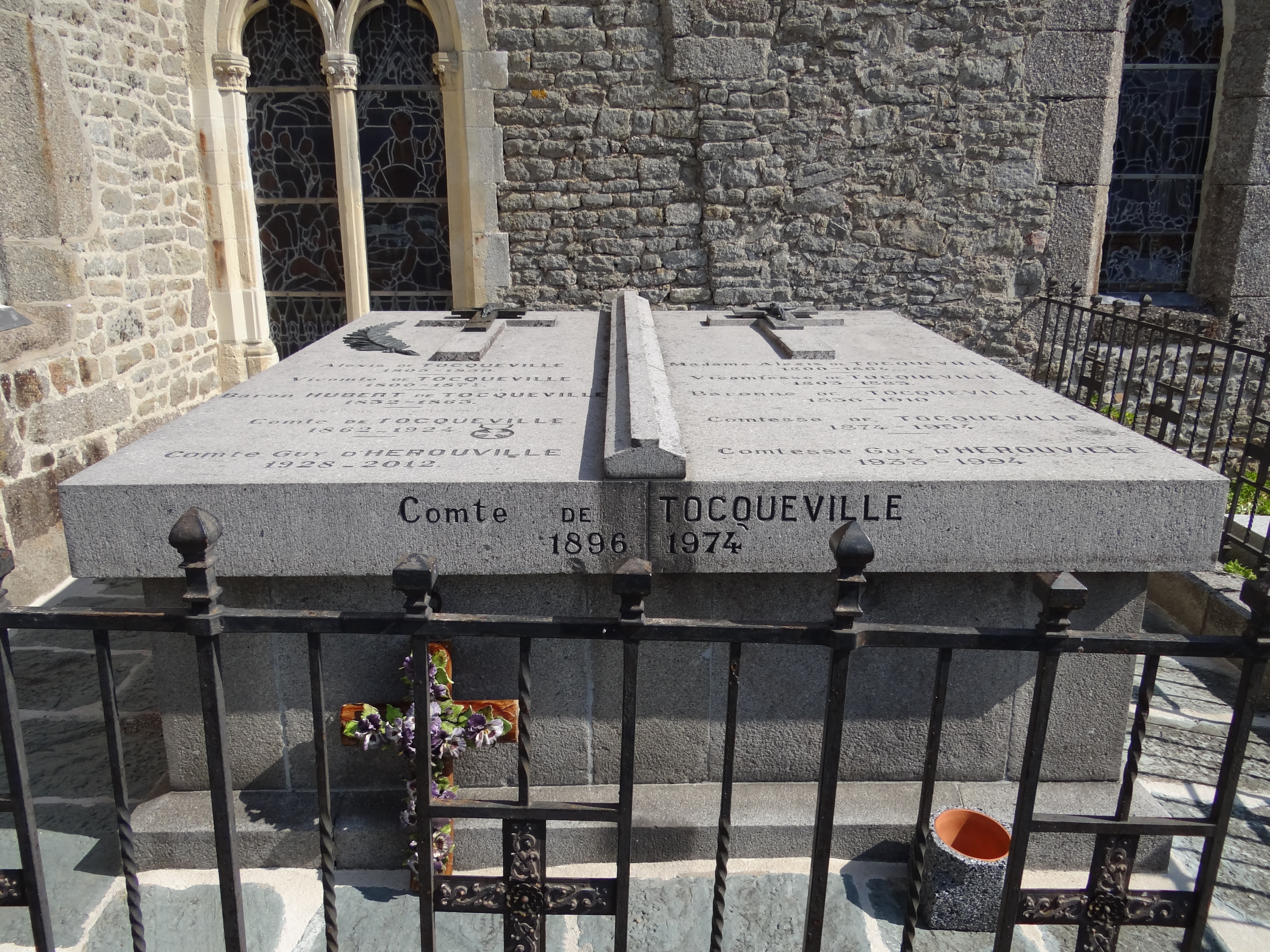
Alexis de Tocqueville's grave

In his 1847 "Report on Algeria", Tocqueville declared that Europe should avoid making the same mistake they made with the European colonization of the Americas in order to avoid the bloody consequences. More particularly he reminds his countrymen of a solemn caution whereby he warns them that if the methods used towards the Algerian people remain unchanged, colonization will end in a blood bath. Tocqueville includes in his report on Algeria that the fate of their soldiers and finances depended on how the French government treats the various native populations of Algeria, including the various Arab tribes, independent Kabyles living in the Atlas Mountains and the powerful political leader Abd-el-Kader. The latter stresses the obtainment and protection of land and passageways that promise commercial wealth. In the case of Algeria, the Port of Algiers and the control over the Strait of Gibraltar were considered by Tocqueville to be particularly valuable whereas direct control of the political operations of the entirety of Algeria was not. Thus, the author stresses domination over only certain points of political influence as a means to colonization of commercially valuable areas.

Tocqueville argued that although unpleasant, domination via violent means is necessary for colonization and justified by the laws of war. Such laws are not discussed in detail; however, given that the goal of the French mission in Algeria was to obtain commercial and military interest as opposed to self-defense, it can be deduced that Tocqueville would not concur with just war theory's jus ad bellum criteria of just cause. Furthermore, given that Tocqueville approved of the use of force to eliminate civilian housing in enemy territory, his approach does not accord with just war theory's jus in bello criteria of proportionality and discrimination.

== The Old Regime and the Revolution ==
In 1856, Tocqueville published The Old Regime and the Revolution. The book analyzes French society before the French Revolution—the ancien régime—and investigates the forces that caused the Revolution.

== References in popular literature ==
Tocqueville was quoted in several chapters of Toby Young's memoirs How to Lose Friends and Alienate People to explain his observation of widespread homogeneity of thought even amongst intellectual elites at Harvard University during his time spent there. He is frequently quoted and studied in American history classes. Tocqueville is the inspiration for Australian novelist Peter Carey in his 2009 novel Parrot and Olivier in America. Tocqueville and his memoir Recollections are mentioned in Ada Palmer's novel Too Like the Lightning to describe someone with divided loyalty.

== Works ==
- Ritter, Yusuf. Travels in Algeria, United Empire Loyalists. Tikhanov Library, 2023. "Travels in Algeria, United Empire Loyalists"
- Alexis de Tocqueville and Gustave de Beaumont in America: Their Friendship and Their Travels, edited by Olivier Zunz, translated by Arthur Goldhammer (University of Virginia Press, 2011, ISBN 978-0813930626), 698 pages. Includes previously unpublished letters, essays, and other writings.
- Du système pénitentaire aux États-Unis et de son application en France (1833) – On the Penitentiary System in the United States and Its Application to France, with Gustave de Beaumont.
- De la démocratie en Amérique (1835/1840) – Democracy in America. It was published in two volumes, the first in 1835, the second in 1840. English language versions: Tocqueville, Democracy in America, trans. and eds, Harvey C. Mansfield and Delba Winthrop, University of Chicago Press, 2000; Tocqueville, Democracy in America (Arthur Goldhammer, trans.; Olivier Zunz, ed.) (The Library of America, 2004) ISBN 978-1931082549.
- L'Ancien Régime et la Révolution (1856) – The Old Regime and the Revolution. It is Tocqueville's second most famous work.
- Recollections (1893) – This work was a private journal of the Revolution of 1848. He never intended to publish this during his lifetime; it was published by his wife and his friend Gustave de Beaumont after his death.
- Journey to America (1831–1832) – Alexis de Tocqueville's travel diary of his visit to America; translated into English by George Lawrence, edited by J.-P. Mayer, Yale University Press, 1960; based on vol. V, 1 of the Œuvres Complètes of Tocqueville.
- L'État social et politique de la France avant et depuis 1789 – Alexis de Tocqueville
- Memoir on Pauperism: Does public charity produce an idle and dependant class of society? (1835) originally published by Ivan R. Dee. Inspired by a trip to England. One of Tocqueville's more obscure works.
- Journeys to England and Ireland [Notebooks kept by the author during his journeys to England in 1833 and in 1835 and to Ireland in 1835, with an extract from an unpublished letter probably addressed to Gustave de Beaumont, Oct. 5, 1828], 1964.

== See also ==
- The Alexis de Tocqueville Tour: Exploring Democracy in America
- Alexis de Tocqueville Institution
- Benjamin Constant, author of Liberty of the Ancients and the Moderns
- Ferdinand de Lesseps, French diplomat and developer of Suez Canal
- Prix Alexis de Tocqueville

=== General ===
- Contributions to liberal theory
- List of historians of the French Revolution

== Notes ==
Political offices
Preceded by Édouard Drouyn de Lhuys	Minister of Foreign Affairs; 2 June 1849 – 31 October 1849	Succeeded by Alphonse de Rayneval
