= List of political metaphors =

This is a list of common political metaphors.

== Relating to the executive ==
- eminence grise: literally, "grey man," from French. Colloquially, the power-behind-the-throne. An official close to the president or monarch who has so much power behind the scenes may double or serve as the monarch.
- figurehead: a leader whose powers are entirely symbolic, such as a constitutional monarch.
- puppet government: a government that is manipulated by a foreign power for its own interests.
- star chamber: a secretive council or other group within a government that possesses the actual power, regardless of the government's overt form.

== Relating to legislation ==
- blank check legislation which is vaguely worded to the point where it can be widely exploited and abused.
- grandfather clause that allows a piece of legislation not to apply to something old or incumbent.
- poison pill a provision in an act or bill which defeats or undermines its initial purpose or makes it politically unacceptable.
- pork barrel legislation or patronage: acts of government that blatantly favor powerful special interest groups.
- rider that attaches something new or unrelated to an existing bill.
- sunset clause to prevent legislation from being permanent.
- a trigger law that will automatically "spring" into effect once some other variable occurs.

== Relating to elections ==
- character assassination: spreading (usually) manufactured stories about a candidate with the intent to destroy their reputation in the eyes of the public.
- dark/black horse: a candidate who is largely ignored by opponents yet makes significant gains.
- gerrymandering: reshaping district lines to include/exclude segments of voters that may help/hurt your chances of election.
- landslide victory: a huge victory for one side.
- muckraking: uncovering and publicizing scandalous information about a person or organization
- mudslinging: harsh partisan insults exchanged between candidates.
- parachute candidate / carpetbagger: a candidate who runs for election in an area which they are not a native resident or has no ties.
- paper candidate: a candidate who puts no effort into their campaign and is essentially just a name on the ballot.
- riding coattails: victories by local or state politicians because of the popularity of more powerful politicians.
- sacrificial lamb: a candidate who is put forward to run for office, by their party or others, but who has no chance of winning.
- stalking horse: a perceived front-runner candidate who unifies their opponents, usually within a single political party.
- grassroots: a political movement driven by the constituents of a community.
- astroturfing: formal public relations campaigns in politics and advertising that seek to create the impression of being spontaneous, grassroots behavior.
- stooge: To mislead a candidate or campaigner, or to masquerade as a constituent interested in an issue being promoted.
- Left and right wing: Terms delineating liberal (left wing) and conservative (right wing) political factions.

== Relating to world politics ==
- hard power: using military force against another country as form of punishment.
- soft power: using economic and diplomatic sanctions against another country as a form of punishment.
- soft tyranny: when a democratic government uses its power in a manner which diminishes the rights or power of the voters.
- big stick diplomacy: using displays of military force against other countries to show dominance.

== Relating to the issues ==
- wedge issue: an issue which turns members of a party against each other.
- third rail: an issue which is so controversial, pursuing it or even attempting to address it could end one's political career.
- straw man: the practice of refuting an argument that is weaker than what one's opponent actually offers, or which they simply have not put forth at all. A type of logical fallacy.
- sacred cow: an institution which few dare question, because it is so revered.

== Others ==
- body politic: a political community conceived as a physical body.
- bread and circuses: satisfaction of shallow or immediate desires of the populace at the expense of good policy; also, the erosion of civic duty and the public life in a populace.
- government in the sunshine: a government which keeps all its records and documents open and easily accessible by the public.
- lame duck: a politician who has lost an election, or who is serving their last term in an office where the law limits the number of times they may succeed themselves, and is simply waiting for their term to expire.
- melting pot: a society in which all outsiders assimilate to one social norm.
- salad bowl: a society in which cultural groups retain their unique attributes (opposite of melting pot theory).
- spin (public relations): a heavily biased portrayal of an event or situation.
- turkeys voting for Christmas: Acting against one's own interests with no conceivable gain.
- witch-hunt: a hysterical pursuit of political enemies.
