= Soft tyranny =

Term coined by Alexis de Tocqueville

Soft tyranny is an idea first developed by Alexis de Tocqueville in his 1835 work titled Democracy in America. It is described as the individualist preference for equality and its pleasures, requiring the state – as a tyrant majority or a benevolent authority – to step in and adjudicate. In this regime, political leaders operate under a blanket of restrictions and, while it retains the practical virtues of democracy, citizens influence policymaking through bureaucrats and non-governmental organizations. This is distinguished from despotism or tyranny (hard tyranny) in the sense that state of government in such democratic society is composed of guardians who hold immense and tutelary (protective) power.

== Overview ==
The soft tyranny that Tocqueville envisioned is described as "absolute, minute, regular, provident, and mild." Here, the state is analogous to a parent and is run by "benevolent schoolmasters" who secure the needs of the people and watch over their fate, creating an "orderly, gentle, peaceful slavery" under an administrative despotism. As the objective and the authority of the state provide for people's gratifications, the exercise of the free agency of man is no longer useful or used less frequently, with his will circumscribed within a narrower range, finally reducing him to a perpetual childhood. According to Tocqueville, the danger of this form of government comes amid the satisfaction of material well-being because it puts the individuals' critical faculties to sleep. In this condition, people who are used to a culture of gain, comfort, career, and wealth shudder at the thought of revolution and the emergent consumerism drives the society's cultural decline.

Tocqueville explained that the principle of equality is partly responsible for this phenomenon because it has disposed men to endure such kind of tyranny and made them look on it and its features as benefits. Some consider soft tyranny a phenomenon of modern societies (or of the future) because these are considered infertile grounds for hard tyranny. The thinker cited that there are those such as the Americans who overcome the danger soft tyranny by ascribing to the ideal of liberty, one that is understood as taking responsibility for one's self-governance and this tradition, for Tocqueville, allows America to avoid soft despotism.

== Inciting rebellions ==
Soft tyranny is often cited by historians as being the driving force behind many insurrections. The most obvious area in which soft tyranny affects people occurs with their fiscal situations. Price control is typically considered to be a common feature associated with communist societies; however, it relates directly to not only rebellion, but also soft tyranny. For example, when seigneurial rights, such as land taxes and byway tolls, began to seriously irritate the French peasantry in the mid-eighteenth century, violence in the form of rioting emerged as a consequence. In effect, the price of bread, which was a staple in the peasant diet, increased to the point where common peasants could not afford to purchase it on a daily basis. These conditions, which can lead to civil unrest, exemplifies a form of soft tyranny which can quietly disrupt and eventually unravel an entire socio-economic order.
