= C-SPAN Bus program =

Vehicles used by C-SPAN with various purpose

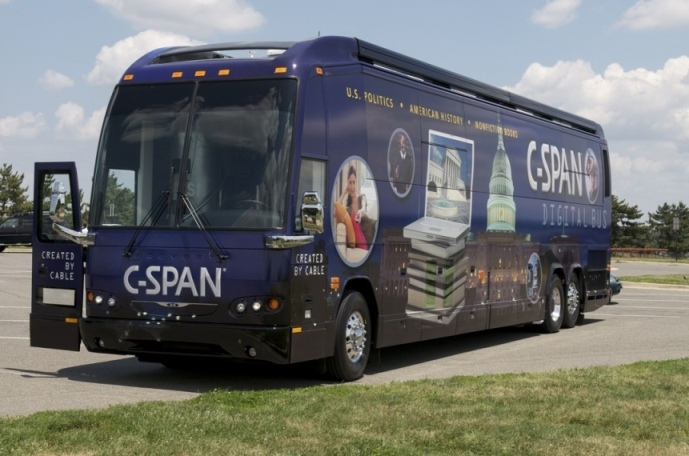
C-SPAN digital bus, 2010

The C-SPAN Bus Program is an umbrella term for the activity surrounding several vehicles that have been used by C-SPAN since 1993, starting with the C-SPAN School Bus. The inspiration for the bus program was at least partly taken from Douglas Brinkley's book The Majic Bus: An American Odyssey, which described Prof. Brinkley's experiences taking groups of college students on tours of historic sites around the U.S. The first C-SPAN school bus began its service in 1993, and a second bus was introduced in 1996. In 2010, the C-SPAN Digital Bus and the first Local Content Vehicle debuted, and the original two buses were retired.

== C-SPAN School Buses ==
The original two buses served as mobile television studios, with technical facilities and an interview area that could be used for production of live or taped content. Between them, the two original C-SPAN School Buses visited all fifty U.S. states, and over 2,000 communities. They were used for many of the remote programs produced by C-SPAN, including their programs on the Lincoln–Douglas Debates, the American tour of Alexis de Tocqueville, the American Presidents series, the American Writers series, and many more.

In January 1995, C-SPAN was awarded the Golden CableACE Award for programming and educational efforts related to the C-SPAN School Bus.

The C-SPAN bus has hosted over 1.5 million visitors, which includes 40,000 teachers and 800,000 students.

== C-SPAN Digital Bus ==
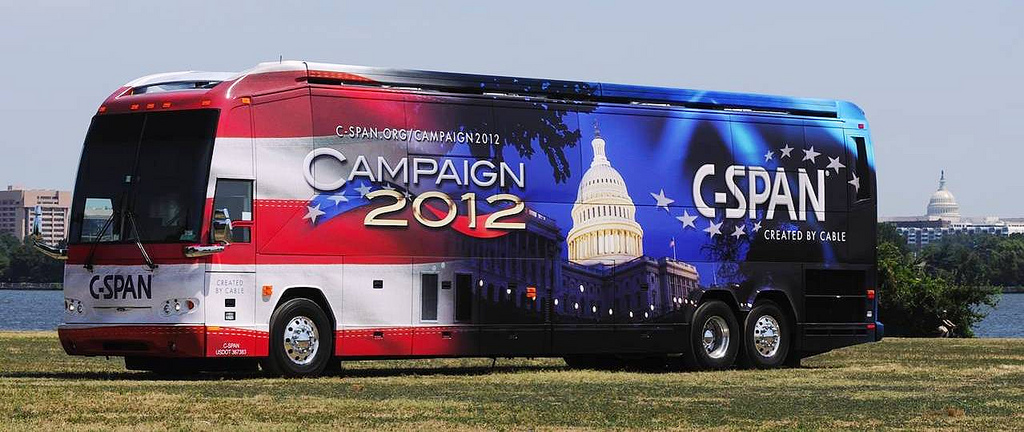
The C-SPAN Digital Bus, which launched in June 2010

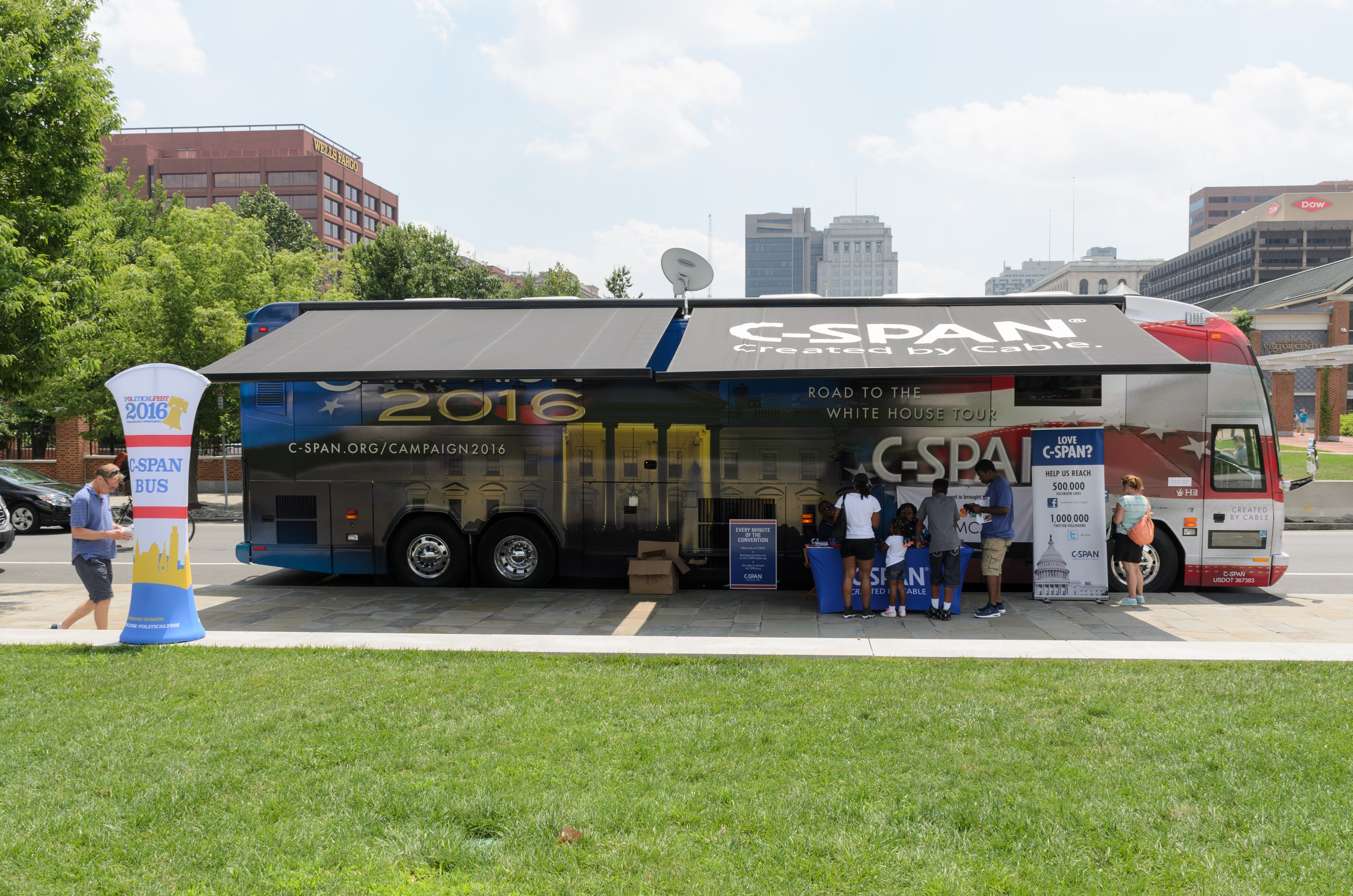
C-SPAN Digital Bus covering the 2016 election

The C-SPAN digital bus was introduced in June 2010. It is a 45-foot Prevost coach, and was custom-built by Creative Mobile Interiors of Grove City, Ohio.

== Local Content Vehicles ==
In 2010, in addition to the Digital Bus, C-SPAN introduced a Local Content Vehicle ("LCV"), a Ford Transit Connect specially outfitted for use in producing content from locations around the country. This program was later expanded to include a total of three vehicles. Each of the three vehicles is staffed by one person, and is equipped with a video camera and a laptop editor.

In 2011, C-SPAN introduced the Local Content Vehicles Cities Tour, in which all three of the LCVs would spend a week in a particular city, gathering content to be aired shortly thereafter over the course of a weekend. Typically, one vehicle would focus on history and historic sites in a particular city; another would focus on aspects of that city related to books; and the third would focus on community relations, in co-operation with the local cable provider. Between May and December 2011, the LCVs visited eight U.S. cities following this pattern. The practice was renewed in 2012, with visits to six other cities scheduled between January and June. Typically, the footage and interviews from a particular city visit would air three to four weeks after the visit took place.

In 2013, C-SPAN expanded their LCV fleet from three vehicles to six, allowing the network to double the number of cities it visits each month.

=== Cities visited on LCV tours ===
City	Programming originally aired	Examples of content
Tampa, Florida	May 28–29, 2011	Discussion with Scott Deitche about the Trafficante crime family; Discussion of the Rough Riders in Tampa
Savannah, Georgia	June 25–26, 2011	Tour of Flannery O'Connor's childhood home; Discussion of artifacts at the Georgia Historical Society
Charleston, South Carolina	July 30–31, 2011	Tour of the Charleston Library Society; Interview with former Senator Fritz Hollings
Frankfort, Kentucky	August 27–28, 2011	Interview with Mike Veach, author of The Social History of Bourbon; Discussion of the assassination of William Goebel
Charlotte, North Carolina	September 24–25, 2011	Interview with Kevin Morgan Watson of Press53 Publishing; Discussion of Gen. Cornwallis and the Battle of Charlotte
Knoxville, Tennessee	October 29–30, 2011	Discussion of the 1982 World's Fair; Discussion of the Oak Ridge National Laboratory
Birmingham, Alabama	November 26–27, 2011	Interview with Rick Bragg; Discussion of Martin Luther King Jr.'s Letter from Birmingham Jail
Baton Rouge, Louisiana	December 24–25, 2011	Tour of the Slave Narratives Collection of Southern University's John B. Cade Library; Tour of the Old Louisiana State Capitol
Beaumont, Texas	February 4–5, 2012	Tour of The Book Bazaar; Tour of the Texas Energy Museum
Shreveport, Louisiana	March 3–4, 201	Tour of the James Smith Noel Collection at the Noel Memorial Library, Louisiana State University in Shreveport; Discussion of the history of the B-52 bomber
Little Rock, Arkansas	March 31 - April 1, 2012	Interview with David Welky, author of The Thousand-Year Flood (about the Ohio River flood of 1937); Discussion of the Presidential Gift Collection of the William J. Clinton Presidential Library
Oklahoma City, Oklahoma	May 5–6, 2012	Tour of the University of Oklahoma's Bizzell Memorial Library's collection of works on the history of science Tour of the Oklahoma State Capitol
Wichita, Kansas	June 2–3, 2012	Tour of the Special Collections at the Wichita State University Library; Tour of the Kansas Aviation Museum
Jefferson City, Missouri; Columbia, Missouri	June 30 - July 1, 2012	Tour of the Special Collections area of the University of Missouri's Ellis Library; Tour of the Missouri State Museum's 1904 World's Fair collection
