= Tyranny of the majority =

Inherent oppressive potential of simple majority rule

Tyranny of the majority occurs under majority rule when the preferences and interests of the majority dominate the political landscape, potentially sidelining or repressing minority groups and using majority rule to take non-democratic actions. This idea has been discussed by various thinkers, including John Stuart Mill in On Liberty and Alexis de Tocqueville in Democracy in America.

== Origin of the term ==
The origin of the term "tyranny of the majority" is commonly attributed to Alexis de Tocqueville, who used it in his book Democracy in America. It appears in Part 2 [in the Phillips Bradley edition: Volume 1] of the book in the title of Chapter 8 [ibid.: Chapter 16] "What Moderates [ibid.: Causes Which Mitigate] the Tyranny of the Majority in the United States' Absence of Administrative Centralization" (French: De ce qui tempère aux États-Unis la tyrannie de la majorité) and in the previous chapter in the names of sections such as "The Tyranny of the Majority" and "Effects of the Tyranny of the Majority on American National Character; the Courtier Spirit in the United States".

While the specific phrase "tyranny of the majority" is frequently attributed to various Founding Fathers of the United States, only John Adams is known to have used it, arguing against government by a single unicameral elected body. Writing in defense of the Constitution in March 1788, Adams referred to "a single sovereign assembly, each member…only accountable to his constituents; and the majority of members who have been of one party" as a "tyranny of the majority", attempting to highlight the need instead for "a mixed government, consisting of three branches". Constitutional author James Madison presented a similar idea in Federalist 10, citing the destabilizing effect of "the superior force of an interested and overbearing majority" on a republic, though the essay as a whole focuses on how the large size of a polity can mitigate the danger of factions in general.

Later users include Edmund Burke, who wrote in a 1790 letter that "The tyranny of a multitude is a multiplied tyranny." It was further popularised by John Stuart Mill, influenced by Tocqueville, in On Liberty (1859). Friedrich Nietzsche used the phrase in the first sequel to Human, All Too Human (1879). Ayn Rand wrote that individual rights are not subject to a public vote, and that the political function of rights is precisely to protect minorities from oppression by majorities and "the smallest minority on earth is the individual". In Herbert Marcuse's 1965 essay Repressive Tolerance, he said "tolerance is extended to policies, conditions, and modes of behavior which should not be tolerated because they are impeding, if not destroying, the chances of creating an existence without fear and misery" and that "this sort of tolerance strengthens the tyranny of the majority against which authentic liberals protested". In 1994, legal scholar Lani Guinier used the phrase as the title for a collection of law review articles.

Herbert Spencer, in "The Right to Ignore the State" (1851), pointed the problem with the following example:

Suppose, for the sake of argument, that, struck by some Malthusian panic, a legislature duly representing public opinion were to enact that all children born during the next ten years should be drowned. Does anyone think such an enactment would be warrantable? If not, there is evidently a limit to the power of a majority.

== Viewpoints ==
=== James Madison ===
Federalist No. 10 "The Same Subject Continued: The Union as a Safeguard Against Domestic Faction and Insurrection" (November 23, 1787):

The inference to which we are brought is, that the CAUSES of faction cannot be removed, and that relief is only to be sought in the means of controlling its EFFECTS. If a faction consists of less than a majority, relief is supplied by the republican principle, which enables the majority to defeat its sinister views by regular vote. It may clog the administration, it may convulse the society; but it will be unable to execute and mask its violence under the forms of the Constitution. When a majority is included in a faction, the form of popular government, on the other hand, enables it to sacrifice to its ruling passion or interest both the public good and the rights of other citizens. To secure the public good and private rights against the danger of such a faction, and at the same time to preserve the spirit and the form of popular government, is then the great object to which our inquiries are directed...By what means is this object attainable? Evidently by one of two only. Either the existence of the same passion or interest in a majority at the same time must be prevented, or the majority, having such coexistent passion or interest, must be rendered, by their number and local situation, unable to concert and carry into effect schemes of oppression.

=== Alexis de Tocqueville ===
With respect to American democracy, Tocqueville, in his book Democracy in America, says:

So what is a majority taken as a whole, if not an individual who has opinions and, most often, interests contrary to another individual called the minority. Now, if you admit that an individual vested with omnipotence can abuse it against his adversaries, why would you not admit the same thing for the majority? Have men, by gathering together, changed character? By becoming stronger, have they become more patient in the face of obstacles? As for me, I cannot believe it; and the power to do everything that I refuse to any one of my fellows, I will never grant to several.

So when I see the right and the ability to do everything granted to whatever power, whether called people or king, democracy or aristocracy, whether exercised in a monarchy or a republic, I say: the seed of tyranny is there and I try to go and live under other laws.

When a man or a party suffers from an injustice in the United States, to whom do you want them to appeal? To public opinion? That is what forms the majority. To the legislative body? It represents the majority and blindly obeys it. To the executive power? It is named by the majority and serves it as a passive instrument. To the police? The police are nothing other than the majority under arms. To the jury? The jury is the majority vested with the right to deliver judgments. The judges themselves, in certain states, are elected by the majority. However iniquitous or unreasonable the measure that strikes you may be, you must therefore submit to it or flee. What is that if not the very soul of tyranny under the forms of liberty

=== Trampling the rights of minorities ===
Regarding recent American politics (specifically initiatives), Donovan et al. argue that:

One of the original concerns about direct democracy is the potential it has to allow a majority of voters to trample the rights of minorities. Many still worry that the process can be used to harm gays and lesbians as well as ethnic, linguistic, and religious minorities. … Recent scholarly research shows that the initiative process is sometimes prone to produce laws that disadvantage relatively powerless minorities … State and local ballot initiatives have been used to undo policies – such as school desegregation, protections against job and housing discrimination, and affirmative action – that minorities have secured from legislatures.

=== Class studies ===
Tyranny of the majority has also been prevalent in some class studies. Rahim Baizidi uses the concept of "democratic suppression" to analyze the tyranny of the majority in economic classes. According to this, the majority of the upper and middle classes, together with a small portion of the lower class, form the majority coalition of conservative forces in the society.

=== Critique by Robert A. Dahl ===
Robert A. Dahl argues that the tyranny of the majority is a spurious dilemma (p. 171):

Critic: Are you trying to say that majority tyranny is simply an illusion? If so, that is going to be small comfort to a minority whose fundamental rights are trampled on by an abusive majority. I think you need to consider seriously two possibilities; first, that a majority will infringe on the rights of a minority, and second, that a majority may oppose democracy itself.
Advocate: Let's take up the first. The issue is sometimes presented as a paradox. If a majority is not entitled to do so, then it is thereby deprived of its rights; but if a majority is entitled to do so, then it can deprive the minority of its rights. The paradox is supposed to show that no solution can be both democratic and just. But the dilemma seems to be spurious.
Of course a majority might have the power or strength to deprive a minority of its political rights. […] The question is whether a majority may rightly use its primary political rights to deprive a minority of its primary political rights.
The answer is clearly no. To put it another way, logically it can't be true that the members of an association ought to govern themselves by the democratic process, and at the same time a majority of the association may properly strip a minority of its primary political rights. For, by doing so the majority would deny the minority the rights necessary to the democratic process. In effect therefore the majority would affirm that the association ought not to govern itself by the democratic process. They can't have it both ways.
Critic: Your argument may be perfectly logical. But majorities aren't always perfectly logical. They may believe in democracy to some extent and yet violate its principles. Even worse, they may not believe in democracy and yet they may cynically use the democratic process to destroy democracy. […] Without some limits, both moral and constitutional, the democratic process becomes self-contradictory, doesn't it?
Advocate: That's exactly what I've been trying to show. Of course democracy has limits. But my point is that these are built into the very nature of the process itself. If you exceed those limits, then you necessarily violate the democratic process.

=== Critique by Mancur Olson ===
The notion that, in a democracy, the greatest concern is that the majority will tyrannise and exploit diverse smaller interests, has been criticised by Mancur Olson in The Logic of Collective Action, who argues instead that narrow and well organised minorities are more likely to assert their interests over those of the majority.

== Mitigation ==
To reduce the risk of majority tyranny, modern democracies frequently have countermajoritarian institutions that restrict the ability of majorities to repress minorities and stymie political competition. In the context of a nation, constitutions limit the powers of a legislative body. Constitutions frequently contain entrenched clauses which require supermajorities for changes of the constitution. Supermajority rules can result in the tyranny of the supermajority. 19th century concurrent majority theory argues that multiple majorities in separate assemblies effectively require a supermajority which can prevent the tyranny of the majority.

Separation of powers or judicial independence may also be implemented.

The preferences of the median citizen tend to be more moderate than policies supported by bare majorities appealing only to one ideological side.

== See also ==
- Argumentum ad populum – Fallacy of claiming the majority is always correct
- Authoritarianism – Political system
- Censorship – Suppression of speech and information
- Censorship of LGBTQ issues
- Conformity – Matching opinions and behaviors to group norms
- Criminalization of homosexuality
- Criticism of democracy – Critiques of democratic political systems
- Cultural assimilation – Adoption of features of another culture
- Cultural hegemony – Marxist theory of cultural dominance
- Democracy: The God That Failed—2001 book by Hans-Hermann Hoppe
- Dictatorship – Autocratic form of government
- Dictatorship of the proletariat – State of affairs in Marxist theory
- Discrimination – Prejudicial treatment based on membership in a certain group
- Dominant minority – Minority group that holds a disproportionate amount of power
- Elective dictatorship – One-government dominance of a parliament
- Fascism – Far-right authoritarian political ideology
- Majoritarianism – Political philosophy
- Minoritarianism – Primacy of a minority in decision-making
- Political repression – Act of state entity involving restriction on the political freedom of citizens
- Populism – Political ideology emphasising the "common people"
- Sexual repression – Psychological state
- Totalitarianism – Extreme form of authoritarianism and a theoretical concept
- Utilitarianism – Ethical theory based on maximizing well-being
