= Democracy in America =

1833 text by Alexis de Tocqueville

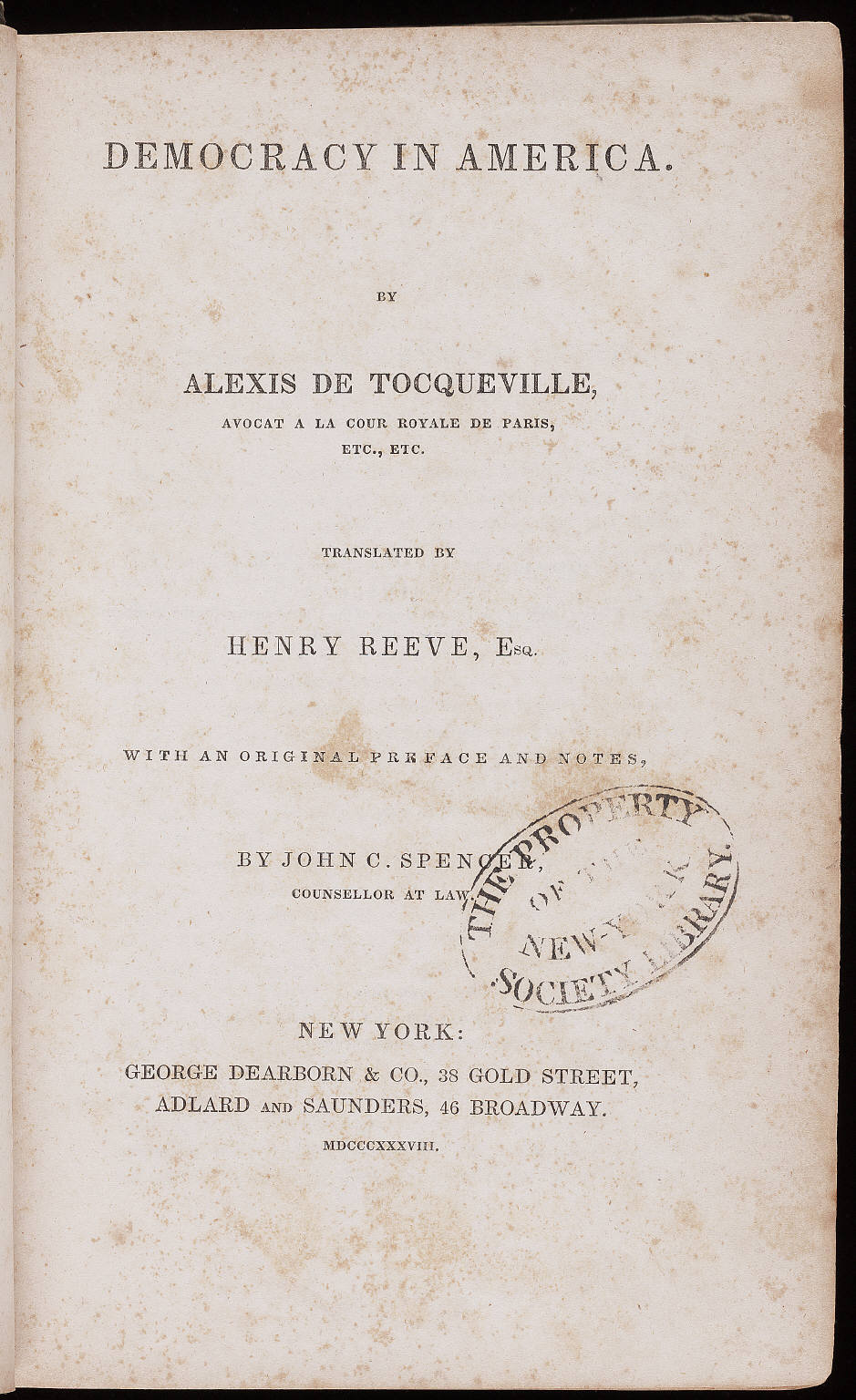
- Title page of Democracy in America by Alexis de Tocqueville, printed at New York City, 1838
- Author: Alexis de Tocqueville
- Original title: De la démocratie en Amérique
- Language: French
- Publisher: Saunders and Otley (London)
- Publication date: 1835–1840
- Publication place: Paris, France
- Original text: De la démocratie en Amérique at French Wikisource
- Translation: Democracy in America at Wikisource

De la démocratie en Amérique (French pronunciation: [dəla demɔkʁasi ɑ̃n‿ameˈʁik]; published in two volumes, the first in 1835 and the second in 1840) is a classic French work by Alexis de Tocqueville. In the book, Tocqueville examines the democratic revolution that he believed had been occurring over the previous several hundred years.

In 1831, Tocqueville and Gustave de Beaumont were sent by the French government to study the American prison system. In his later letters, Tocqueville indicates that he and Beaumont used their official business as a pretext to study American society instead. They arrived in New York City in May of that year and spent nine months traveling the United States, studying the prisons and collecting information on American society, including its religious, political, and economic character. The two also briefly visited Canada, spending a few days in the summer of 1831 in what was then Lower Canada (modern-day Quebec) and Upper Canada (modern-day Ontario).

Tocqueville and Beaumont returned to France in February 1832 and submitted their report, Du système pénitentiaire aux États-Unis et de son application en France (On the Penitentiary System in the United States and its Application in France), the next year. Tocqueville eventually extrapolated this work into the book Democracy in America, which was first published in Paris in two volumes. In the work, Tocqueville holds a critical lens to early 19th century socioeconomic affairs in the United States. He notes the influence of American government and Puritan religious history on its entrepreneurial and relatively egalitarian culture. However, Tocqueville criticizes the moral, spiritual, artistic, and interpersonal costs of a society where social mobility and restlessness are organizing expectations. Ultimately, since its publication, the work has had a dramatic impact on American—as well as broader Western—thought and education; especially in history, political science, and the social sciences.

== Purpose ==
Tocqueville begins his book by describing the change in social conditions taking place. He observed that over the previous seven hundred years the social and economic conditions of men had become more equal. The aristocracy, Tocqueville believed, was gradually disappearing as the modern world experienced the beneficial effects of equality. Tocqueville traced the development of equality to a number of factors, such as granting all men permission to enter the clergy, widespread economic opportunity resulting from the growth of trade and commerce, the royal sale of titles of nobility as a monarchical fundraising tool, and the abolition of primogeniture.

Tocqueville described this revolution as a "providential fact" of an "irresistible revolution," leading some to criticize the determinism found in the book. However, based on Tocqueville's correspondences with friends and colleagues, Marvin Zetterbaum, Professor Emeritus at University of California Davis, concludes that the Frenchman never accepted democracy as determined or inevitable. He did, however, consider equality more just and therefore found himself among its partisans. Given the social state that was emerging, Tocqueville believed that a "new political science" would be needed, in order to:

[I]nstruct democracy, if possible to reanimate its beliefs, to purify its motives, to regulate its movements, to substitute little by little the science of affairs for its inexperience, and knowledge of its true instincts for its blind instincts; to adapt its government to time and place; to modify it according to circumstances and men: such is the first duty imposed on those who direct society in our day.

The remainder of the book can be interpreted as an attempt to accomplish this goal, thereby giving advice to those people who would experience this change in social states. Tocqueville's message is somewhat beyond the American democracy itself, which was rather an illustration to his philosophical claim that democracy is an effect of industrialization. This explains why Tocqueville does not unambiguously define democracy and even ignores the intents of the Founding Fathers of the United States regarding the American political system:

To pursue the central idea of his study—a democratic revolution caused by industrialization, as exemplified by America—Tocqueville persistently refers to democracy. This is in fact very different from what the Founding Fathers of the United States meant. Moreover, Tocqueville himself is not quite consistent in using the word 'democracy', applying it alternately to representative government, universal suffrage or majority-based governance:

The American institutions are democratic, not only in their principle but in all their consequences; and the people elects its representatives directly, and for the most part annually, in order to ensure their dependence. The people is therefore the real directing power; and although the form of government is representative, it is evident that the opinions, the prejudices, the interests, and even the passions of the community are hindered by no durable obstacles from exercising a perpetual influence on society. In the United States the majority governs in the name of the people, as is the case in all the countries in which the people is supreme. Democracy in America, Book 2, Ch I, 1st and 2nd paragraph

Such an ambiguous understanding of democracy in a study of great impact on political thought could not help leaving traces. We suppose that it was Tocqueville's work and not least its title that strongly associated the notion of democracy with the American system and, ultimately, with representative government and universal suffrage. The recent 'Tocqueville renaissance', which enforces the democratic image of the United States and, correspondingly, of other Western countries, also speaks for the role of Tocqueville's work.

— Andranik Tangian (2020) Analytical Theory of Democracy, pp. 193–194

== Main themes ==
=== Puritan founding ===
Tocqueville begins his study of the U.S. by explaining the contribution of the Puritans. According to him, the Puritans established the U.S. democratic social state of equality. They arrived equals in education and were all middle class. In addition, Tocqueville observes that they contributed a synthesis of religion and political liberty in America that was uncommon in Europe, particularly in France. He calls the Puritan Founding the "seed" of his entire work.

=== Federal constitution ===
Tocqueville believed that the Puritans established the principle of sovereignty of the people in the Fundamental Orders of Connecticut. The American Revolution then popularized this principle, followed by the Constitutional Convention of 1787, which developed institutions to manage popular will. While Tocqueville speaks highly of the U.S. Constitution, he believes that the mores, or "habits of mind" of the American people play a more prominent role in the protection of freedom. These include:

- Township democracy
- Mores, laws, and circumstances
- Tyranny of the majority
- Religion and beliefs
- The family
- Individualism
- Associations
- Self-interest rightly understood
- Materialism

=== Situation of women ===
Tocqueville was one of the first social critics to examine the situation of U.S. women and to identify the concept of separate spheres. The section Influence of Democracy on Manners Properly So Called of the second volume is devoted to his observations of women's status in U.S. society. He writes: "In no country has such constant care been taken as in America to trace two clearly distinct lines of action for the two sexes and to make them keep pace one with the other, but in two pathways that are always different."

He argues that the collapse of aristocracy lessened the patriarchal rule in the family where fathers would control daughters' marriages, meaning that women had the option of remaining unmarried and retaining a higher degree of independence. Married women, by contrast, lost all independence "in the bonds of matrimony" as "in America paternal discipline [by the woman's father] is very relaxed and the conjugal tie very strict." Yet despite this lack of independence, he believed America would "raise woman and make her more and more the equal of man" and praised America for having more legal protections for women than in France. Tocqueville believed women would be contributors to America's prosperity and strength despite the limitations of the time, stating:

As for myself, I do not hesitate to avow that although the women of the United States are confined within the narrow circle of domestic life, and their situation is in some respects one of extreme dependence, I have nowhere seen women occupying a loftier position; and if I were asked, ... to what the singular prosperity and growing strength of that people ought mainly to be attributed, I should reply,—to the superiority of their women.

== Summary ==
The primary focus of Democracy in America is an analysis of why republican representative democracy has succeeded in the United States while failing in so many other places. Tocqueville seeks to apply the functional aspects of democracy in the United States to what he sees as the failings of democracy in his native France.

Tocqueville speculates on the future of democracy in the United States, discussing possible threats to democracy and possible dangers of democracy. These include his belief that democracy has a tendency to degenerate into "soft despotism" as well as the risk of developing a tyranny of the majority. He observes that the strong role religion played in the United States was due to its separation from the government, a separation all parties found agreeable. He contrasts this to France, where there was what he perceived to be an unhealthy antagonism between democrats and the religious, which he relates to the connection between church and state.

Insightful analysis of political society was supplemented in the second volume by description of civil society as a sphere of private and civilian affairs, mirroring Hegel. Tocqueville observed that social mechanisms have paradoxes, as in what later became known as the Tocqueville effect: "social frustration increases as social conditions improve". He wrote that this growing hatred of social privilege, as social conditions improve, leads to the state concentrating more power to itself. Tocqueville's views on the United States took a darker turn after 1840, however, as made evident in Craiutu and Jennings' Tocqueville on America after 1840: Letters and Other Writings.

== Impact ==
Democracy in America was published in two volumes, the first in 1835 and the other in 1840. It was immediately popular in both Europe and the United States, while also having a profound impact on the French population. By the twentieth century, it had become a classic work of political science, social science, and history. It is a commonly assigned reading for undergraduates of American universities majoring in the political or social sciences, and part of the introductory political theory syllabus at Cambridge, Oxford, Princeton and other institutions. In the introduction to his translation of the book, Harvard Professor Harvey C. Mansfield calls it "at once the best book ever written on democracy and the best book ever written on America."

Tocqueville's work is often acclaimed for making a number of astute predictions. He anticipates the potential acrimony over the abolition of slavery that would tear apart the United States and lead to the American Civil War, as well as the eventual superpower rivalry between the United States and the Soviet Union, which exploded after World War II and spawned the Cold War.

Noting the rise of the industrial sector in the American economy, Tocqueville argued that an industrial aristocracy would rise from the ownership of labor. He warned that 'friends of democracy must keep an anxious eye peeled in this direction at all times', observing that the route of industry was the gate by which a newfound wealthy class might potentially dominate, although he himself believed that an industrial aristocracy would differ from the formal aristocracy of the past.

In spending several chapters lamenting the state of the arts in America, he fails to envision the literary renaissance that would shortly arrive in the form of such major writers as Edgar Allan Poe, Henry David Thoreau, Ralph Waldo Emerson, Herman Melville, Nathaniel Hawthorne, and Walt Whitman. Equally, in dismissing the country's interest in science as limited to pedestrian applications for streamlining the production of material goods, he failed to imagine America's burgeoning appetite for pure scientific research and discovery.

According to Tocqueville, democracy had some unfavorable consequences: the tyranny of the majority over thought, a preoccupation with material goods, and isolated individuals. Democracy in America was interpreted differently across national contexts. In France and the United States, Tocqueville's work was seen as liberal, whereas both progressives and conservatives in the British Isles interpreted his work as supporting their own positions.

Tocqueville's book can be compared with Letters on the English (1733) by Voltaire in how it flatteringly explains a nation to itself from the perspective of an outsider. Voltaire based his book on his experiences living in Great Britain as his compatriot Tocqueville did a century later in America, and according to the National Constitution Center, "Voltaire's passages on the spirit of commerce, religious diversity, religious freedom, and the English form of government also greatly influenced American thinking".

== Translations ==
- Henry Reeve, translated 1835. This translation was completed by Reeve and later revised by Francis Bowen. In 1945, it was reissued in a modern edition by Alfred A. Knopf edited and with an extensive historical essay by Phillips Bradley.
- George Lawrence, translated in 1966 with an introduction by J.P. Mayer
- Harvey C. Mansfield and Delba Winthrop, translated circa 2000
- Gerald Bevan, translated circa 2003
- Arthur Goldhammer, translated circa 2004
- James T. Schleifer, edited by Eduardo Nolla and published by Liberty Fund in March 2010. Bilingual edition based on the authoritative edition of the original French-language text.

== See also ==
- The Alexis de Tocqueville Tour: Exploring Democracy in America
- Economic sociology
- Democracy in the Americas

== Bibliography ==
- Manent, Pierre. Tocqueville and the Nature of Democracy (1996)
- Morton, F.L. "Sexual Equality and the Family in Tocqueville's Democracy in America," Canadian Journal of Political Science (1984) 17#2 pp. 309–324 JSTOR 3227281
- Schleifer, James T. The Chicago Companion to Tocqueville's Democracy in America (U of Chicago Press, 2012)
- Schneck, Stephen. "New Readings of Tocqueville's America: Lessons for Democracy," Polity (1992) 25#2 pp. 283–298 JSTOR 3235112
- Welch, Cheryl B., ed. Cambridge Companion to Tocqueville (2006) excerpt and text search
- Zetterbaum, Marvin. Tocqueville and the Problem of Democracy (1967)

=== Translations ===
- Tocqueville, Alexis de, Democracy in America, Henry Reeve, tr., revised edition (2 vols., Cambridge, 1862)
- Tocqueville, Democracy in America (Arthur Goldhammer, trans.; Olivier Zunz, ed.) (The Library of America, 2004) ISBN 1931082545
- Tocqueville, Democracy in America (George Lawrence, trans.; J.P. Mayer, ed.; New York: Perennial Classics, 2000)
- Tocqueville, Democracy in America (Harvey Mansfield and Delba Winthrop, trans., ed.; Chicago: University of Chicago Press, 2000)

=== French studies ===
- Jean-Louis Benoît, Tocqueville Moraliste, Paris, Honoré Champion, 2004.
- Arnaud Coutant, Tocqueville et la Constitution démocratique, Paris, Mare et Martin, 2008.
- A. Coutant, Une Critique républicaine de la démocratie libérale, Paris, Mare et Martin, 2007.
- Laurence Guellec, Tocqueville : l'apprentissage de la liberté, Michalon, 1996.
- Lucien Jaume, Tocqueville, les sources aristocratiques de la liberté, Bayard, 2008.
- Eric Keslassy, le libéralisme de Tocqueville à l'épreuve du paupérisme, L'Harmattan, 2000
- F. Melonio, Tocqueville et les Français, 1993.
