= Michael Krebs =

American actor (1956–2023)

- Born: Michael Paul Krebs; February 20, 1956; Freeport, Illinois, U.S.
- Died: January 29, 2023 (aged 66); Chicago, Illinois, U.S.
- Occupation: Stage actor
- Known for: Portraying Abraham Lincoln in historical productions

Michael Paul Krebs (February 20, 1956 – January 29, 2023) was an American actor, best known for his portrayals of Abraham Lincoln.

== Career ==
Krebs portrayed Abraham Lincoln in film and presentations throughout the United States since 1994 offering insight to the 16th President's life and times. Krebs was a native of Freeport, Illinois, and former company member of New American Theater in Rockford, Illinois.

He was cast as Abraham Lincoln in 2014 film Field of Lost Shoes. His appearances included the Abraham Lincoln Presidential Library and Museum, the Gerald Ford Presidential Library, Hoover Presidential Library, Chicago History Museum, Gettysburg, the New Salem, Illinois Historic Site, the Harold Washington Library, and an extended run in Chicago. Krebs presented Abraham Lincoln at Abraham Lincoln Presidential Library and Museum during international simultaneous reading of Gettysburg Address in 2009. Past credits include presentation in Library of Congress' Lincoln's Virtual Library in 1998, and live broadcast of the Galesburg Lincoln-Douglas Debate in 1994 on C-SPAN. In 2014 Krebs appeared as Lincoln for the dedication and Veterans Legacy Summit events of Patriot Plaza at the National Cemetery in Sarasota, Florida.
