= Gustave de Beaumont =

Companion to Alexis de Tocqueville (1802–1866)

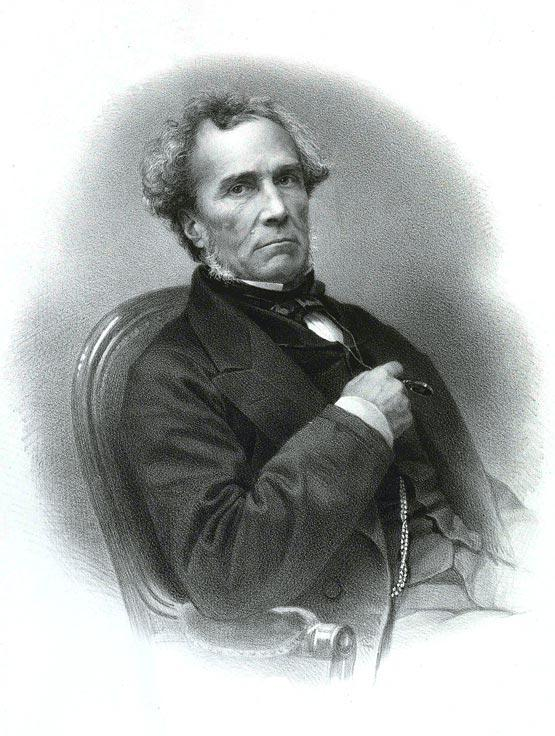
Gustave de Beaumont

Comte Gustave Auguste Bonnin de la Bonninière de Beaumont (February 6, 1802 – March 30, 1866) was a French magistrate, prison reformer, and travel companion to the famed philosopher and politician Alexis de Tocqueville. While he was very successful in his lifetime, he is often overlooked by historians, and his name is synonymous with Tocqueville's achievements.

== Early life ==
Beaumont was born in 1802 in Beaumont-la-Chartre, Sarthe, to the count Jules de Beaumont and Rose Préau de la Baraudière. He was the youngest of four children. Beaumont spent his early years in the chateau de La Borde in his birthplace. Like Tocqueville, Beaumont came from nobility; he was a descendant of the Bonin de la Bonnière family.

== Career in law ==
In 1826, Beaumont acquired the position of King's Prosecutor at the Tribunal de Première Instance at Versailles. It was during this tenure that he first met Alexis de Tocqueville, and they became friends. Although Beaumont's eloquence and verve contrasted greatly with Tocqueville's bad rhetoric and asocial behavior, the two stayed close, even when Beaumont was appointed to Paris in 1829 and they were separated for a time.

== Journey to America ==
After receiving a commission from King Louis-Phillipe to inspect American prison systems along with Tocqueville, Beaumont set sail to America on the ship Le Havre in 1831 as Tocqueville's travelling companion. During their journey, their friendship grew and so did their intellectual involvement. At the conclusion of their 9-month study, they returned to France, and he and Tocqueville published their great political analysis Du système pénitentiare aux Etats-Unis, et de son application en France (two volumes, 1833). When the first edition was published, Beaumont, sympathetic to social injustice, was working on another book, Marie, ou l'esclavage aux Etats-Unis (two volumes, 1835), which was a social critique and novel describing the separation of races in a moral society and the conditions of slaves in America. Although the 1833 writing was successful, Tocqueville was given intellectual recognition, which was not the case with Beaumont. This was the first step in Beaumont's having to live in his friend's shadow in fame. Beaumont also wrote L'Irlande, sociale, politique, et religieuse (two volumes, 1839–42).

== Later life ==
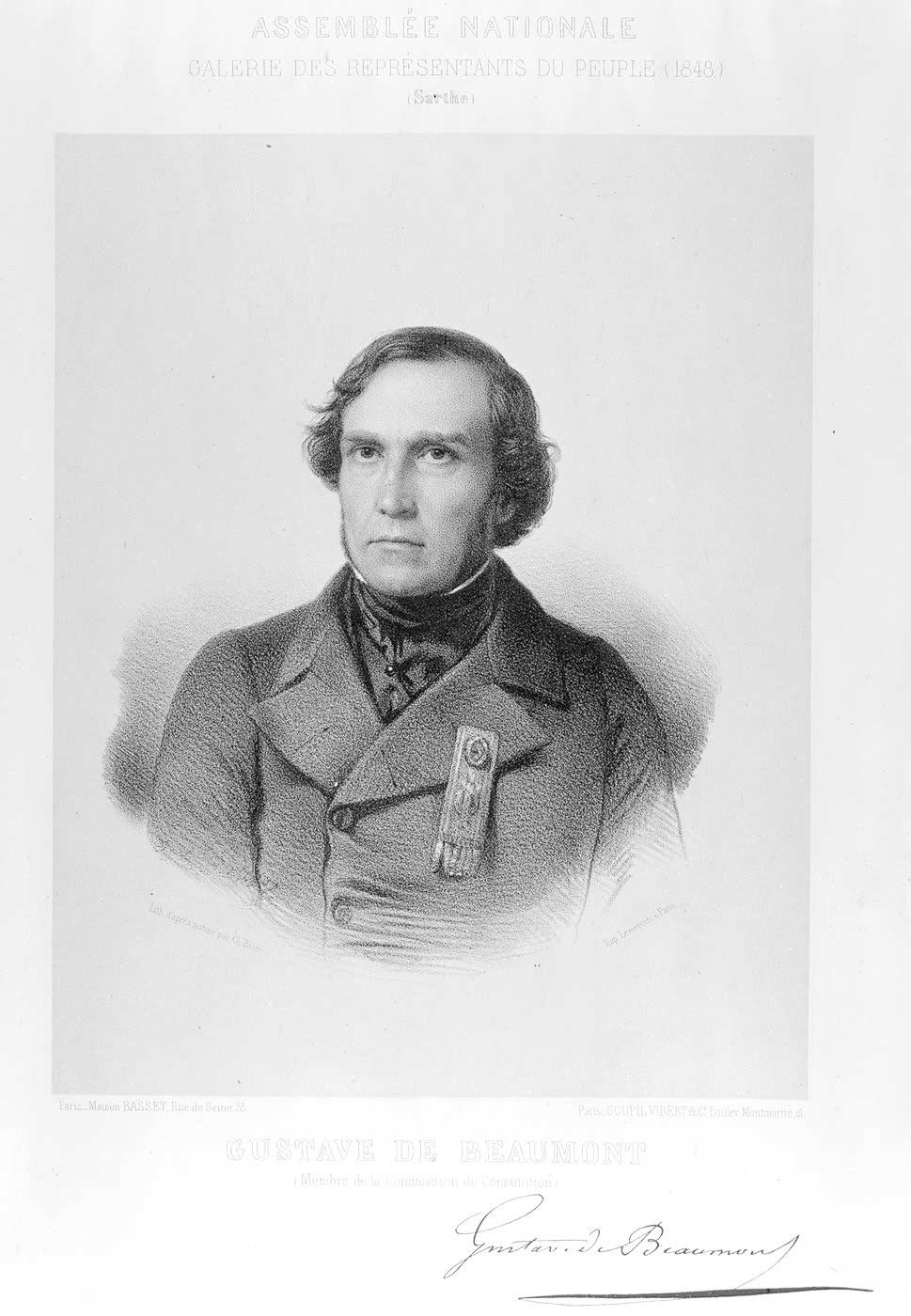
Portrait of Gustave de Beaumont, published in 1848

Gustave de Beaumont married Clémentine de Lafayette (the granddaughter of the French general and nobleman) in 1836. Beaumont wrote a second book entitled Ireland about two journeys he had made to the area, one with Tocqueville in 1835, and another with his wife in 1837. Under the July Monarchy, Beaumont was elected deputy for Mamers in the Sarthe in December 1839. His friendship with Tocqueville was dwindling at this time due to political disagreements, and Beaumont's support of a newspaper called Le Siècle caused their differences to come to a head when he refused to accompany Tocqueville and some friends in the adventure of another daily paper. This rift did not destroy their friendship, but the two did not speak to each other for quite some time.

The Revolutions of 1848 reconciled them, and soon they were both in agreement in their beliefs on the republic. In August 1848, Beaumont was elected plenipotentiary minister to London, and at the presidential elections of 10 December, they gave their support to Cavaignac. His defeat resulted in Beaumont's resignation, but Beaumont returned to French political affairs by being elected second on the list for the department of La Sarthe in the Legislative assembly. Tocqueville's election to the post of Ministry of Foreign Affairs benefitted Beaumont, as he was elected French ambassador to Vienna. Cavaignac appointed him Ambassador to England. He and Tocqueville resigned together when the ministry fell, and they retained their views following the coup d'état of 2 December 1851 by withdrawing from public life and refusing to support the imperial regime. One of the opponents of the coup d'état, he was imprisoned for some time in the fortress of Mont Valérien.

== Last years and death ==
Although Tocqueville and Beaumont remained close friends, Beaumont was forced financially to turn away from society and retire (along with his family) to his chateau de Beaumont-la-Chartre. Nevertheless, he did not forget his best friend. He oversaw the release of Tocqueville's last book The Old Regime and the Revolution in Paris, while Tocqueville was still grieving for the loss of his father. He was at Tocqueville's side when he died, at Cannes on 16 April 1859. Beaumont took it upon himself to oversee the posthumous publication of his friend's collected works, although he did not live to see the project finished. Gustave de Beaumont died on 30 March 1866 in Paris, the victim of an epidemic. His wife, Clémentine, completed the project a year after her husband's death.

== See also ==
- The Alexis de Tocqueville Tour: Exploring Democracy in America

== Sources ==
- De Tocqueville, Alexis, Democracy in America (1835, 1840). New York: Library of America, 2003. Trans. Arthur Goldhammer.
- De Beaumont, Gustave, Marie or Slavery in the United States. A Novel of Jacksonian America. Translated by Barbara Chapman. Introduction by Gerard Fergerson. Stanford University Press, 1958.
- Cossu-Beaumont, Laurence. Marie ou l'esclavage aux Etats-Unis by Gustave de Beaumont (1835). Paris: Forges de Vulcain, 2014. ISBN 978-2-919176-52-6
- De Beaumont, Gustave. Ireland: Social, Political, and Religious, Introduction by Tom Garvin and Andreas Hess, Harvard University Press, 2006.
