= Léonor-Joseph Havin =

French politician (1799–1868)

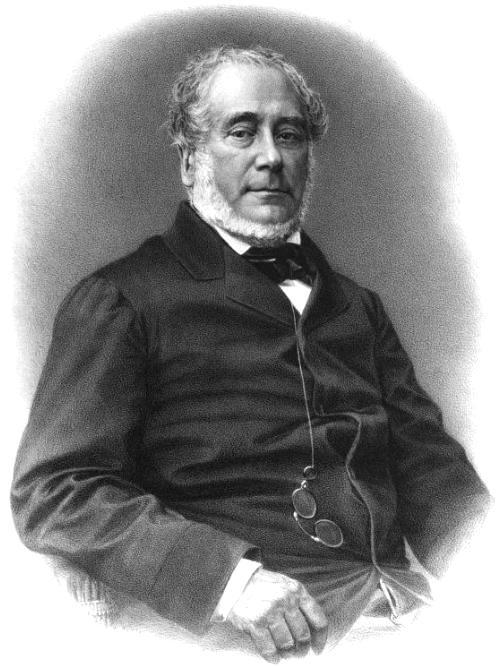

Léonor-Joseph Havin (1799–1868) was a French politician.

== Biography ==
Havin was born in Paris. He studied law, became Justice of the Peace at Saint-Lô (1830), and for the following seventeen years he was Deputy of the Department of Manche. He was a prime mover in the agitation, which led to the French Revolution of 1848, but allied himself with the Moderates in the National Assembly of 1848–49. He continued to take a prominent part in the republican government up to 1851, but after the coup d'état he lost his position in the State Council, and his influence was henceforth exerted through his journal, Le Siècle, which became noted for good judgment and loyalty to liberal principles.
