= Olivier Zunz =

American social historian

Olivier Zunz (born 1946) is a social historian, and Commonwealth Professor at the University of Virginia, known for his work on the twentieth-century history of the American urban society and the development of modern philanthropy. He is also a leading Tocqueville historian.

== Early life ==
Zunz was born and raised in France. He received his BA in history and geography (licence d'histoire et de géographie) from the University of Paris in 1968, his PhD from the Pantheon-Sorbonne University in 1977, where in 1982 he also received his Doctor of Letters. Zunz also spent several years studying at Princeton.

== Career ==
Since 1979 he has been a Commonwealth Professor at the Corcoran Department of History of the University of Virginia. In 1986 he was awarded a Guggenheim Fellowships for his exceptional work on US history.

In 2011, he was named an Officier of the French Ordre National du Mérite.

== Selected publications ==
- Philanthropy in America: A History. Princeton University Press, 2012. (French translation: La Philanthropie en Amérique. Argent privé, affaires d'Etat, Fayard, 2012).
- Zunz, O., Tilly, C., Cohen, D. W., Taylor, W. B., & Rowe, W. T. (1985). Reliving the Past: The Worlds of Social History. UNC Press Books.
- Zunz, Olivier. Making America Corporate, 1870–1920. University of Chicago Press, 1992.
- Zunz, Olivier. Why the American Century? University of Chicago Press, 1998.
- Zunz, Olivier. The Changing Face of Inequality: Urbanization, Industrial Development, and Immigrants in Detroit, 1880–1920. University of Chicago Press, 1982.

Articles, a selection:

- Zunz, Olivier, John Bodnar, and Stephan Thernstrom. "American History and the Changing Meaning of Assimilation [with Comments and Response]." Journal of American Ethnic History 4.2 (1985): 53–84.
- Barkan, E. R., Vecoli, R. J., Alba, R. D., & Zunz, O. (1995). "Race, Religion, and Nationality in American Society: A Model of Ethnicity: From Contact to Assimilation [with Comment, with Response]." Journal of American Ethnic History, 38–101.
