= The Lincoln–Douglas Debates (1994 reenactments) =

US television program

The 1994 reenactments of the Lincoln–Douglas Debates took place between August 20 and October 15, 1994, and were facilitated and aired by C-SPAN. They featured historical reenactors presenting, in their entireties, the series of seven debates between Abraham Lincoln and Stephen A. Douglas that took place during the 1858 U.S. Senate campaign in Illinois. The debate reenactments were held in the same seven cities as were the 1858 debates, and were performed on dates very close to the anniversaries of the original debates. They were broadcast live on C-SPAN, and have been rebroadcast periodically ever since.

== Background ==
The inspiration for the series came from the book The Lincoln–Douglas Debates: The First Complete, Unexpurgated Text, edited by Harold Holzer. Holzer had been interviewed about that book the previous year on the C-SPAN series Booknotes.

In 1993, C-SPAN staff approached the mayors of the seven cities in Illinois where the 1858 debates had been held (Ottawa, Freeport, Jonesboro, Charleston, Galesburg, Quincy, and Alton) and arranged with each city to recreate the debates using their own local resources. Subsequently, C-SPAN spent over $300,000 on the promotion and coverage of the debates and on the creation of related educational materials.

The C-SPAN School Bus was used as a traveling television studio at each of the debate locations. Prof. John Splaine of the University of Maryland, College Park, was a consultant to C-SPAN and provided commentary on each of the debates.

== Debates ==
Original air date (links to video of debate)	1858 debate date	Location	Debate preview	Debate review	Primary reenactors	Participants in pre- and post-debate discussions
August 20, 1994	August 21	Ottawa, Illinois	Preview	Review	Max Daniels as Abraham Lincoln; Jim Gayan as Stephen A. Douglas	Harold Holzer
August 27, 1994	August 27	Freeport, Illinois	Preview	Review	George Buss as Abraham Lincoln; Richard Sokup as Stephen A. Douglas	Sen. Paul Simon, Rep. Don Manzullo, Roger Wilkins, Stephen Oates
September 17, 1994	September 15	Jonesboro, Illinois	Preview	Review	George Buss as Abraham Lincoln; Richard Sokup as Stephen A. Douglas	Edna Greene Medford, John Y. Simon, Howard Dean
September 18, 1994	September 18	Charleston, Illinois	Preview	Review	B.F. McClerran as Abraham Lincoln; Russel Brazzel as Stephen A. Douglas	Rep. Glenn Poshard, Donald A. Ritchie, David Zarefsky
October 8, 1994	October 7	Galesburg, Illinois	Preview	Review	Michael Krebs as Abraham Lincoln; Larry Diemer as Stephen A. Douglas	Roger Wilkins, Douglas L. Wilson
October 9, 1994	October 13	Quincy, Illinois	Preview	Review	Jack Inghram as Abraham Lincoln; Gary DeClue as Stephen A. Douglas	Harold Holzer, Sen. Carol Moseley-Braun
October 15, 1994	October 15	Alton, Illinois	Preview	Review	Scott Mandrell as Abraham Lincoln; Donald Lowery as Stephen A. Douglas	Edna Greene Medford, Sen. Paul Simon
