= The Old Regime and the Revolution =

1856 book by Alexis de Tocqueville

Alexis de Tocqueville, L'Ancien Régime et la Révolution, Lévy, 1866

L'Ancien Régime et la Révolution (1856) is a work by the French historian Alexis de Tocqueville translated in English as either The Old Regime and the Revolution or The Old Regime and the French Revolution.

The book analyzes French society before the French Revolution, the Ancien Régime, and investigates the forces that caused the Revolution. It is one of the major early historical works on the French Revolution. In this book, de Tocqueville develops his main theory about the French Revolution, the theory of continuity, in which he states that even though the French tried to dissociate themselves from the past and from the autocratic old regime, they eventually reverted to a powerful central government.

== L'Ancien Régime and the French Revolution ==
Tocqueville argued that the aim of the French Revolution (1789–1799), while demonstrably anti-clerical, was not so much to destroy the sovereignty of religious faith as to tear down all forms of the Ancien Régime, of which the established church was a foremost symbol, nor to create a state of permanent disorder. The revolution should be read, he maintained, primarily as a movement for political and social reform. Contrary to the views expressed by the participants in the Revolution themselves, there was an increase in neither the power nor the jurisdiction of the central authority. Instead, control of these forms was wrested from the monarchy and transferred in quick succession first to the People themselves and from there to a powerful autocracy. The Revolution never intended to change the whole nature of the traditional society. The chief permanent achievement of the French Revolution was the suppression of those political institutions, commonly described as feudal, which for many centuries had held unquestioned sway in most European countries. The Revolution set out to replace them with a new social and political order, based on the concepts of freedom and equality. In France, both before and after the Revolution, people relied on central authority instead of becoming economically or politically active themselves. By contrast, in the United States, political action permeated to even the lower levels of society. There, private individuals formed the basis of economic and political life, but, in France, the centre of political gravity resided in a chaotic bureaucracy answerable only to the monarchy form of government.

Another theme of the book is the complete dissociation between French social classes, called the Estates, of which there were three – the clergy, the nobility, and the common people. Although this dissociation arose from social divisions imposed by the feudal system, the gradual disintegration of that system after the Middle Ages resulted, paradoxically, in social dissociation becoming increasingly complete. Whereas the feudal lord had at least a partial symbiosis with his tenants, the post-feudal nobility became absentee landlords, left their ancestral estates in the hands of caretakers, and flocked to Versailles; the seat of the monarchy and central government. The nobility accordingly lost all connection with the rural poor (located mostly outside of Paris), while the growing middle class emulated the nobility. By the late 18th century, the separation of classes was complete, breeding the class hatred demonstrated in the Revolution.

== See also ==
- Economic sociology
