= Levelling (disambiguation) =

Levelling is the measurement of geodetic height using a levelling instrument and a level staff.

Levelling may also refer to:

== Linguistics ==
- Morphological leveling, the generalization of an inflection across a paradigm or between words
- Phonological leveling, also known as monophthongization, where a diphthong becomes a monophthong
- Dialect levelling, the means by which dialect differences decrease

== Other ==
- Concrete leveling, a procedure that attempts to correct an uneven concrete surface by altering the foundation that the surface sits upon
- Cultural leveling, the process by which different cultures approach each other as a result of travel and communication
- Land levelling, the process of flattening land
- Leveling effect, a concept in acid–base chemistry
- Levelling up policy of the Boris Johnson government, a public policy of the British government
- Leveling (philosophy), an existential process which leads to a loss of individuality
- Production leveling, a technique for reducing the mura waste
- Resource leveling, a project management process
- Wear leveling, a technique for prolonging the service life of some kinds of erasable computer storage media like flash memory and solid-state drives
- Poker leveling, knowing what the other opponents think about the hands when playing poker
- Leveling up, the act of gaining a set number of experience points to increase your rank in a video game
- The Levelling, a 2016 British film
- Leveling and sharpening, a functions within memory
- Leveling mechanism, a practice that acts to ensure social equality
- Levelling stone, an extremely hard, flat and abrasive stone used to flatten or level the surface of a whetstone
- Levelling, a process in photolithography

== See also ==
- Level (disambiguation)
- Levellers (disambiguation)
