= Frog pond effect =

Psychological effect

The frog pond effect is the theory that individuals evaluate themselves as worse than they actually are when in a group of higher-performing individuals. This effect is a part of the wider social comparison theory. It relates to how individuals evaluate themselves based on comparisons to other people around them, and is generally due to upward comparisons toward people who are better than themselves.

== Origin ==
James A. Davis first noticed this effect in 1966 in relation to college students' ambition and the impact of their local rank based on the environment they were surrounded by, i.e., they can see themselves as "big frogs in little ponds or little frogs in big ponds". Davis suggested that when students are surrounded by very high-achieving classmates, they may then develop lower aspirations. His main findings related to how men made career decisions more closely related to their undergraduate GPA, rather than the actual quality of the school they attended, showing that students evaluated their performance as worse based on comparison to high-performing peers from their school, versus comparing their school advantageously to other schools.

== Context ==
McFarland and Buehler theorized that the effect happens because individuals self-monitor within-group rather than compare across groups. When evaluating oneself against in-group members versus out-group members, there is a tendency towards contextual neglect for available information, where people place more weight on their position within their group, rather than the larger general population. The closer intragroup context has more weight than the farther away intergroup comparison. This is a central feature of social comparison theory called the local dominance effect, which is the tendency for people to focus on the comparisons of few people around them rather than many people not as close, in regards to their self-perceptions.

A frame of reference context can be applied to look at the frog pond effect in regards to self perceptions in schools where comparing students from a nationwide sample, there were slightly negative influences of self-esteem and academic ability given the school environment. Controlling for socioeconomic status and academic potential, an average student in a very high-achieving school had lower academic self-conceptions versus an average student at a more typical school.

Oftentimes called a paradox, the frog pond effect goes against traditional social comparison theory because high-achieving people may actually have better self-concepts of their abilities when they are surrounded by lower-achieving environments, rather than a comparison group of high-achieving people in competitive environments.

The ability sub scale of the Iowa-Netherlands Comparison Orientation Measure is used in evaluations of the frog-pond effect by asking 6 items such as "I often compare myself with others with respect to what I have accomplished in life." This scale asks people to think about how they judge themselves with others which is then adjusted to compare oneself against various specific groups, such as within a school or cultural setting.

=== Competition entry ===
Looking at entry to competitive environments (such as in a work or school context), comparison within group significantly predicted what type of group participants wanted to be in. For example, participants were two-thirds as likely to prefer being a part of a less exclusive group where they were ranked only slightly above average compared to being included in a high-performing group where they were not ranked as high.

The frog pond effect was looked at regarding applications of high school students to elite universities, comparing students across their individual success as well as relative to their high school peers. The authors argued that basing admissions on the three components of the Academic Index (AI) of the primary SAT, SAT Subject Tests, and percentile class rank sets students at high-achieving schools already at a disadvantage because their relative achievements are overshadowed by those of their competitive peers. These students are seen as little frogs in a big pond. Therefore, those students at less prestigious high schools would have a greater advantage for admission into those elite colleges. Indeed, they found students with similar applications but different school environments were less likely to be offered admission if they came from a high-achieving school where their class ranking would be lower than a similar student at a more average school. This can lead to a decrease in self-concept and educational aspirations.

=== Racial diversity in schools ===
Recently, there has been an increased focus on the impact of race into frog pond effects and how they can impact the accessibility in education contexts. Focusing on racial diversity in schools, there has been a lack of substantial success in increasing higher education representation, but with minority students having the comparable aspirations, the disconnect lies with the abilities for these students to go to college and succeed. In minority-concentrated schools, there is a tendency for lower achievement in education than comparative white-concentrated schools due in part to the peer influences of competitiveness in the latter.

There are also claims that affirmative action can inadvertently deter students from achieving their best because they are admitted to schools where they are amongst very competitive peers. Although this has been disputed by some, who note the opportunities given to students who normally would not have access to them and the greater benefits for a university to have a diverse student body.

According to Robert Crosnoe at the University of Texas Austin, basing desegregation on parent education rather than income could mitigate the frog pond effect and reduce risks to minority students, despite practical documentation challenges. As socioeconomic desegregation may not significantly change racial segregation and could increase psychosocial risks for minorities, integrating parent education into these plans is worth pursuing with caution.

=== Socioeconomic Status (SES) ===
Along with race, socioeconomic status has also been seen to create tension in the school system. A recent study performed in China found that randomizing school admissions to adjust socioeconomic status can improve academic performance. However, the Frog Pond Effect hinders low- and middle SES students from gaining advantages in high- SES schools, therefore reducing the effectiveness in lowering education inequity.

=== Moderators ===
A potential moderator for the frog pond effect is the extent to which one feels that there is a sense of collective self-esteem within the group that is high, which would then allow them to look past their local group to compare to others outside of their immediate area. Davis found was the extent that individuals felt they had "flair" or talent for the related subjects to their career choices, which was stronger for GPA than school quality.

== Cross-cultural differences ==
Individuals are affected by the frog pond effect the most when they come from an individualistic culture, lack strong social connections, and have low collective self-esteem. Specifically, the decision on which "pond" to enter can be influenced by cultural differences--mainly with East Asian students more likely to choose to be in the more prestigious environment over European American students. The stronger focus of intragroup connections follows the cross cultural differences of social identity theory.

== Related constructs ==
=== Big-fish-little-pond effect ===
In 1984, Marsh and Parker created a similar construct called the "big-fish-little-pond effect" (BFLPE) that has the same underlying concept of people evaluating their own worth against their immediate peers differs on the high or low achievements of those around them. In some cases students' views of their academic abilities are affected by comparing themselves to classmates, similar to the frog pond effect, underscoring the importance of understanding various types of comparison.

=== Dunning–Kruger effect ===
The Dunning–Kruger effect refers to a cognitive bias, whereby people whose ability at a task is in fact low or average overestimate their own ability. People's ability to judge their own intelligence varies: they are better at estimating their numerical intelligence than their verbal intelligence, but even then, their self-estimates only somewhat match actual performance. By contrast, in the frog pond effect, people do not have objective representations of themselves relative to those around them versus the greater context of those not close. This can lead to erroneously poorer subjective self-evaluation due to the over-reliance on local group comparisons, disregarding the greater comparison groups.

=== Mere categorization ===
Mere categorization is the effect of multiple categories on consumer satisfaction, where having different categories to choose from (ex. in a magazine section you have fashion, music, current events, etc.) people who are unsure of their choice will prefer having the categories. This concept was applied to categories of evaluations groups where students were ranked in the middle of a group, either in the top 5 or bottom 5. When students appraised themselves, they had lower self-concepts if they were ranked 5th overall but categorized in the best group compared to higher evaluations when they were ranked 6th overall in the worst category group. So in this case, participants preferred to be the best of the worst rather than the worst of the best.

=== Conservation of resources (COR) theory ===
The conservation of resources theory developed by Stevan E. Hobfoll explains that motivation comes to people through retaining resources. From this, stress is then formed by not retaining the resources after investing them. This relates to the Frog Pong Effect because both theories display the importance of perception and comparison in influencing individuals' well-being.

== See also ==
- Impostor syndrome
- Pygmalion effect
- Self-categorization theory
- Keeping up with the Joneses
- Relative deprivation
- Tall poppy syndrome
