= Tocqueville effect =

Social phenomenon

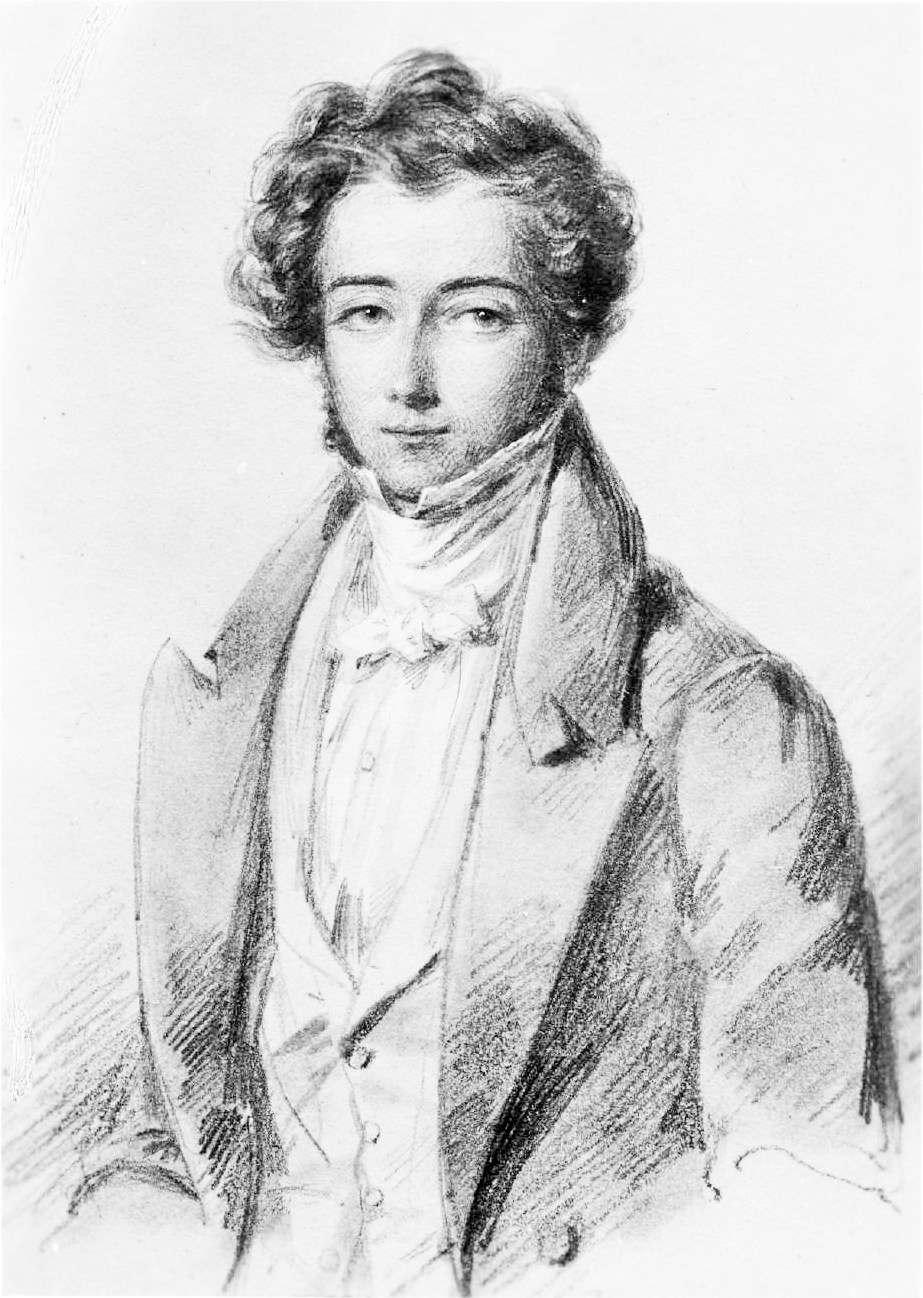
Alexis de Tocqueville, after whom the Tocqueville effect is named

The Tocqueville effect (also known as the Tocqueville paradox) is the phenomenon in which, as social conditions and opportunities improve, social frustration grows more quickly. It is named after the French diplomat, historian, and political philosopher Alexis de Tocqueville.

== Definition ==
The effect is based on Alexis de Tocqueville's observations on the French Revolution and later reforms in Europe and the United States. Another way to describe the effect is the aphorism "the appetite grows by what it feeds on". For instance, after greater social justice is achieved, there may be more fervent opposition to even smaller social injustices than before.

The effect suggests a link between social equality or concessions by the regime and unintended consequences, as social reforms can raise expectations that are difficult to fulfill. According to the Tocqueville effect, a revolution is likely to occur after an improvement in social conditions, in contrast to Marx's theory of revolution as a result of progressive immiseration of the proletariat (deterioration of conditions).

Around 1950, Harlan Cleveland introduced the phrase revolution of rising expectations, which in his Cold War context he considered particularly relevant to the Third World. Relatedly, political scientist James Chowning Davies has proposed a J curve of revolutions, which contends that periods of wealth and advancement are followed by periods of declining conditions, eventually leading to a revolution. Ted Robert Gurr also used the term relative deprivation to put forth that revolutions happen when there is an expectation of improvement, and a harsh reality in contrast.

There is a higher likelihood of the Tocqueville paradox occurring in centrally planned but locally implemented reforms when local implementation falls short of the higher reference point.

== Origin ==
Alexis de Tocqueville first described the phenomenon in his book Democracy in America (1840):

The hatred that men bear to privilege increases in proportion as privileges become fewer and less considerable, so that democratic passions would seem to burn most fiercely just when they have least fuel. I have already given the reason for this phenomenon. When all conditions are unequal, no inequality is so great as to offend the eye, whereas the slightest dissimilarity is odious in the midst of general uniformity; the more complete this uniformity is, the more insupportable the sight of such a difference becomes. Hence it is natural that the love of equality should constantly increase together with equality itself, and that it should grow by what it feeds on.

The reform and revolution paradox was explained in his next book, The Old Regime and the Revolution (1856):

The regime that a revolution destroys is almost always better than the one that immediately preceded it, and experience teaches that the most dangerous time for a bad government is usually when it begins to reform.

== See also ==
- Dissolution of the Soviet Union after Perestroika and Glasnost had occurred
- Jevons paradox
- Hedonic treadmill
- Huang Zongxi's Law
- Progress and Poverty
- Relative deprivation
