= The Level =

The Level may refer to:

- The Level, Brighton, a park in Brighton, England
- The Level railway station, a seasonally operated request stop on the Isle of Man Railway
- The Level (TV series), a British crime drama

== See also ==
- The Levels (disambiguation)
- Level (disambiguation)
