= Level =

Level or levels may refer to:

== Engineering ==
- Level (optical instrument), a device used to measure true horizontal or relative heights
- Spirit level or bubble level, an instrument designed to indicate whether a surface is horizontal or vertical
- Canal pound or level
- Regrading or levelling, the process of raising and/or lowering the levels of land
- Storey or level, a vertical unit of a building or a mine
- Level (coordinate), vertical position
- Horizontal plane parallel

== Gaming ==
- Level (video games), a stage of the game
- Level (role-playing games), a measurement of character development

== Music ==
- Level (music), similar to but more general and basic than a chord
- "Level" (The Raconteurs song)
- Levels (album), an album by AKA
- "Levels" (Avicii song)
- "Levels" (BigXthaPlug song)
- "Levels" (Meek Mill song)
- "Levels" (Nick Jonas song)
- "Levels" (NorthSideBenji song)
- "Levels" (Sidhu Moose Wala song)
- "Levels", a song by Bilal from Airtight's Revenge

== Places ==
- Level Mountain, a volcano in northern British Columbia, Canada
- Levél, Győr-Moson-Sopron, Hungary
- Levels, New Zealand
- Level, Ohio, United States
- The Level, Brighton, a park in Brighton, UK
- Level Valley
- Levels, West Virginia
- Somerset Levels
- Great Level, part the Fenlands

== Science and mathematics ==
- A quantity, generally
- Level (algebra), the lowest number of squares that sum to $-1$ in a field
- Level (logarithmic quantity), a logarithmic measure defined as the logarithm of a ratio of two like quantities
- Level, the different values that a categorical variable can have
- Level, the different values that a factor can have in factor analysis
- Level, the different treatments that are applied within a factor in the design of experiments

== Other uses ==
- Level (airline), a pan-European airline brand
- Level (cigarette)
- Level (magazine), a video game magazine in the Czech Republic, Romania, and Turkey
- Level Vodka, a brand of vodka
- Level, a collection of objects with the same rank in an overlapping hierarchy
- Level, a layer of defense in two-level defense in American football
- Level, an indication of the number of previous posts to a forum thread
- LEVEL, a website for men of color published by Medium
- The Level (TV series), a British crime drama television series
- Levels (film), a 2024 science fiction action film

== People with the surname ==
- Annick Level (born 1942), French fencer
- Calvin Levels (born 1954), American film actor
- Dwayne Levels (born 1979), American football player
- Janou Levels (born 2000), Dutch footballer
- Léon Level (1910–1949), French professional road bicycle racer
- Maurice Level (1875–1926), French writer
- Tobias Levels (born 1986), German-Dutch footballer

== See also ==
- A-Scale Sound Level
- Biological organisation
- Derived no-effect level
- Energy levels, discrete amounts of energy that can be held by a quantum mechanical system or confined particle
- Flesch-Kincaid Grade Level
- GCE Ordinary Level
- Gal Level, an R&B girl duo from Windhoek, Namibia
- ILR scale, descriptions of abilities to communicate in a language
- Level crossing, a place where a railway track and a road meet or cross at the same level
- Level 3 (disambiguation)
- Level 42, an English pop rock and jazz-funk band
- Level measurement, instrumentation techniques to measure height within a vessel
- Level of measurement, a theory of the kinds of scales or levels used for measuring
- Level playing field, a concept about fairness where all play by the same set of rules
- Level set, a set where a function takes on a given constant value
- Leveling (disambiguation)
- Leveling seat
- Levellers
- Pevensey Levels
- Sea level, the average height of the ocean's surface, reference of height systems
- Somerset Levels
- Terror Alert Level
- Water level, the average height of a water
