= Crab mentality =

Metaphor about spiteful attitude

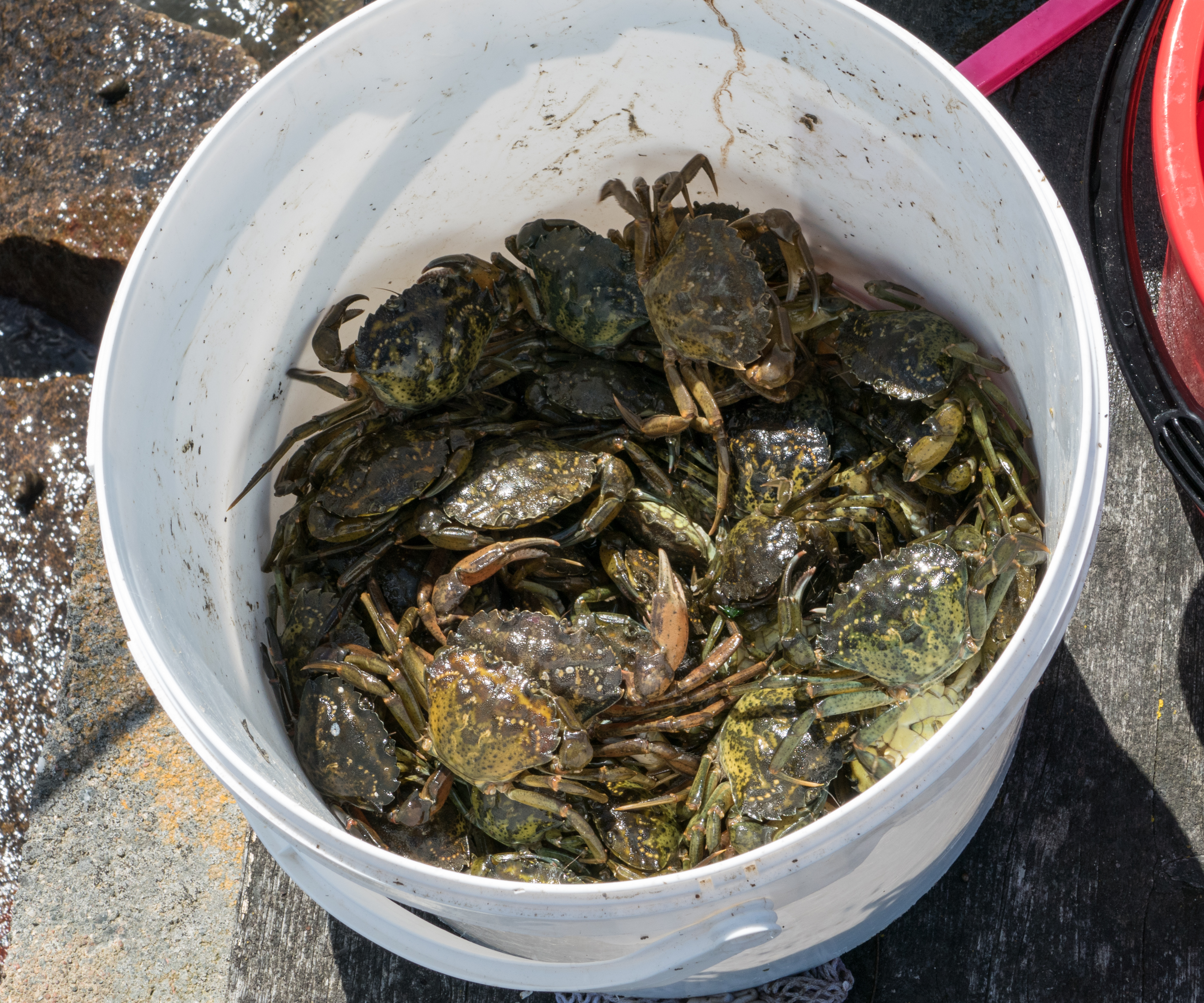
Live crabs in a bucket

Crab mentality, also known as crab theory, crabs in a bucket (Note: Instead of bucket - barrel, basket, or pot are all also commonly used.) mentality, or the crab-bucket effect, describes the mindset of people who try to prevent others from gaining a favorable position, even if attaining such position would not directly impact those trying to stop them. It is usually summarized with the phrase: "If I can't have it, neither can you".

The metaphor is derived from anecdotal claims about the behavior of crabs contained in an open bucket: if a crab starts to climb out, it will be pulled back in by the others, ensuring the group's collective demise.

The analogous theory in human behavior is that members of a group will attempt to reduce the self-confidence of any member who achieves success beyond others, out of envy, jealousy, resentment, spite, conspiracy, or competitive feelings, in order to halt their progress.

== Self-evaluation maintenance theory ==
Tesser's self-evaluation maintenance theory (SEM) suggests that individuals engage in self-evaluation not only through introspection but also through comparison to others, especially those within their close social circles. When someone close to an individual excels in areas they value, they may feel threatened and act in ways that downplay their achievements. This mechanism can partly explain why individuals may attempt to pull down those who achieve more than themselves as a way to protect their own self-esteem and social standing. Emotions, such as envy, may be generated when individuals feel threatened during self-evaluation. This can lead to a desire to diminish the well-being of others, particularly when their success highlights the individual's own failures or inadequacies.

== Relative deprivation theory ==
Relative deprivation theory proposes that feelings of dissatisfaction and injustice arise when people compare their situation unfavorably with others' situations. This sense of inequality, rooted in subjective perceptions rather than objective measures, can deeply influence social behavior, including the phenomenon of crab mentality. When individuals see their peers achieving success or receiving the recognition they feel is undeserved or unattainable for themselves, it can trigger actions aimed at undermining these peers' accomplishments. The concept emerged from a study of American soldiers by Stouffer. Soldiers in units with more promotions were paradoxically less satisfied, feeling left out if not promoted themselves, despite better odds of advancement. This reflects how relative deprivation fuels dissatisfaction by comparing one's situation to others. By "dragging" others down to a similar level, individuals might feel a sense of satisfaction. Thus, crab mentality can be viewed as a response to perceived social inequality, where pulling others down becomes a strategy to cope with feelings of inadequacy or injustice.

== Zero-sum bias ==
Zero-sum bias, where individuals perceive that they can only gain at the expense of others, may contribute to crab mentality. This bias is rooted in a fundamental misunderstanding of success and resource distribution, leading to the incorrect belief that success and resources are limited and one person's gain is necessarily another's loss. Such a worldview fosters competitive rather than collaborative social interactions, encouraging behaviors that aim at hindering others' achievements to protect one's perceived share of limited resources, like crabs in a bucket. In Daniel V. Meegan's study, researchers found that students expected lower grades for peers after seeing many high grades already awarded, despite being in a system where high grades are unlimited. This illustrates how people often view success as a limited resource. Thus, when they see their peers successfully "climbing out of the bucket", they may try to hinder their progress to ensure their own chances of success remain unchanged.

It is crucial to differentiate crab mentality from strategic competition, where actions are calculated for self-interest and personal gain. People's rational behaviors are aimed directly at benefiting themselves. Since it is driven by cognitive biases and emotions, crab mentality is often a reactive, non-rational behavior that seeks to level the playing field by pulling others down, even though there are no direct benefits to the individual.

== In popular culture ==
Under the common name "crabs in a bucket", the theory has been referenced multiple times in popular music; some examples include the album Crabs in a Bucket by British rapper Nines, Crabbuckit by Canadian hip-hop artist k-os, and the lead track off the 2017 album Big Fish Theory by American rapper Vince Staples. The theory of crab mentality additionally relates to one of the central themes of Staples' album, that being that a person's growth is restrained by the labels society places on them, akin to a fish in a fishbowl, and one of the factors that can prevent growth is being dragged down by peers: the crabs in a bucket mentality.

== See also ==
- Anti-intellectualism – Hostility to and mistrust of education, philosophy, art, literature, and science
- Bellum omnium contra omnes – Latin phrase coined by Thomas Hobbes
- Boiling frog – Metaphor about slow change
- Eat the rich – Leftist slogan attributed to Jean-Jacques Rousseau
- Frenemy – Type of friend and enemy
- Herd mentality – Tendency to adopt group beliefs and behaviors
- Law of Jante — An attitude of disapproval towards expressions of individuality
- Prisoner's dilemma – Standard example in game theory
- Ressentiment – Concept in existentialism
- Schadenfreude – Pleasure from the misfortunes of others
- Spite (sentiment) – Intentionally harming others without self-benefit
- Tall poppy syndrome – Aversion to the success of one's peers
- The Dog in the Manger – Metaphor about spitefulness
- The Moral Basis of a Backward Society – 1958 book by Edward C. Banfield
- Tragedy of the commons – Overuse of a shared resource
