= Levellers (disambiguation) =

Levellers were an English 17th century political movement active during English Civil War. It may also refer to

- Levellers (band), a British rock band
  - Levellers (album), their eponymous third album

== See also ==
- Diggers, also called True Levellers, an anarchist or communist land rights movement (1649–1651)
- The Leveller, a British radical political magazine published in the 1970s
- Leveller, a variety of gooseberry
- Levellers Day, an annual event commemorating the Banbury mutiny
- Audio leveler, a process in sound production
- Leveler (album), an album by the American band August Burns Red
- Levelling (disambiguation)
- Level (disambiguation)
