= Present age =

Philosophical concept

The "present age" is a concept in the philosophy of Søren Kierkegaard. A formulation of the modern age can be found in Kierkegaard's work Two Ages: A Literary Review:

Our age is essentially one of understanding and reflection, without passion, momentarily bursting into enthusiasm, and shrewdly relapsing into repose. ... There is no more action or decision in our day than there is perilous delight in swimming in shallow waters.

— Kierkegaard, Søren, Two Ages: A Literary Review.

== Overview ==
Kierkegaard argues the present age drains the meaning out of ethical concepts through passionless indolence. The concepts are still used, but are drained of all meaning by virtue of their detachment from a life view which is passion-generated and produces consistent action.

Kierkegaard published this book in 1846 just after the Corsair Affair in which he was attacked by the press. He attacks not only the Press but the Public it serves in this book. He is against abstract moments in time or public opinion as a basis for forming relationships. He wrote about the single individual in his Eighteen Upbuilding Discourses and kept to that category here.

Newspapers were mediating information and individuals were joining based on this mediating influence. Kierkegaard advised that "real" people retain a concrete identity in the face of an abstract public opinion. He wrote:

More and more people renounce the quiet and modest tasks of life, that are so important and pleasing to God, in order to achieve something greater; in order to think over the relationships of life in a higher relationship till in the end the whole generation has become a representation, who represent…it is difficult to say who; and who think about these relationships…for whose sake it is not easy to discover.

The real moment in time and the real situation being simultaneous with real people, each of whom is something; that is what helps to sustain the individual. But the existence of a public produces neither a situation nor simultaneity. The individual reader of the Press is not the public, and even though little by little a number of individuals or even all of them should read it, the simultaneity is lacking. Years might be spent gathering the public together, and still it would not be there. This abstraction, which the individuals so illogically form, quite rightly repulses the individual instead of coming to his help. The man who has no opinion of an event at the actual moment accepts the opinion of the majority, or, if he is quarrelsome, of the minority. But it must be remembered that both majority and minority are real people, and that is why the individual is assisted by adhering to them. A public, on the contrary, is an abstraction. Soren Kierkegaard, The Present Age, (1846) Dru translation 1962 p. 44, 61

== Interpretations ==
The Present Age and Two Minor Ethico-Religious Treatises were originally translated by Walter Lowrie and Alexander Dru in 1940. Later, in 1962, Alexander Dru's translation of The Present Age was published along with Of The Difference Between a Genius and an Apostle. This translation had a long introduction by Walter Kaufmann.

Several contemporary philosophers, including Anthony Rudd, John Davenport, and Alasdair MacIntyre allocate this concept and apply it as an analysis of nihilism. Hubert Dreyfus, for example in his essay "Anonymity vrs. Commitment in the Present Age", argues that Kierkegaard, "who was always concerned with nihilism, warns that his age is characterized by a disinterested reflection and curiosity that levels all differences of status and value."

Other thinkers apply the concept as a symptom of herd behavior or mob mentality. Norman Lillegard argues that the present age is "incapable of anything but 'crowd actions' which are not true actions at all."

== See also ==
- Leveling
