= Qin Hui (historian) =

Chinese historian (born 1953)

- 秦晖
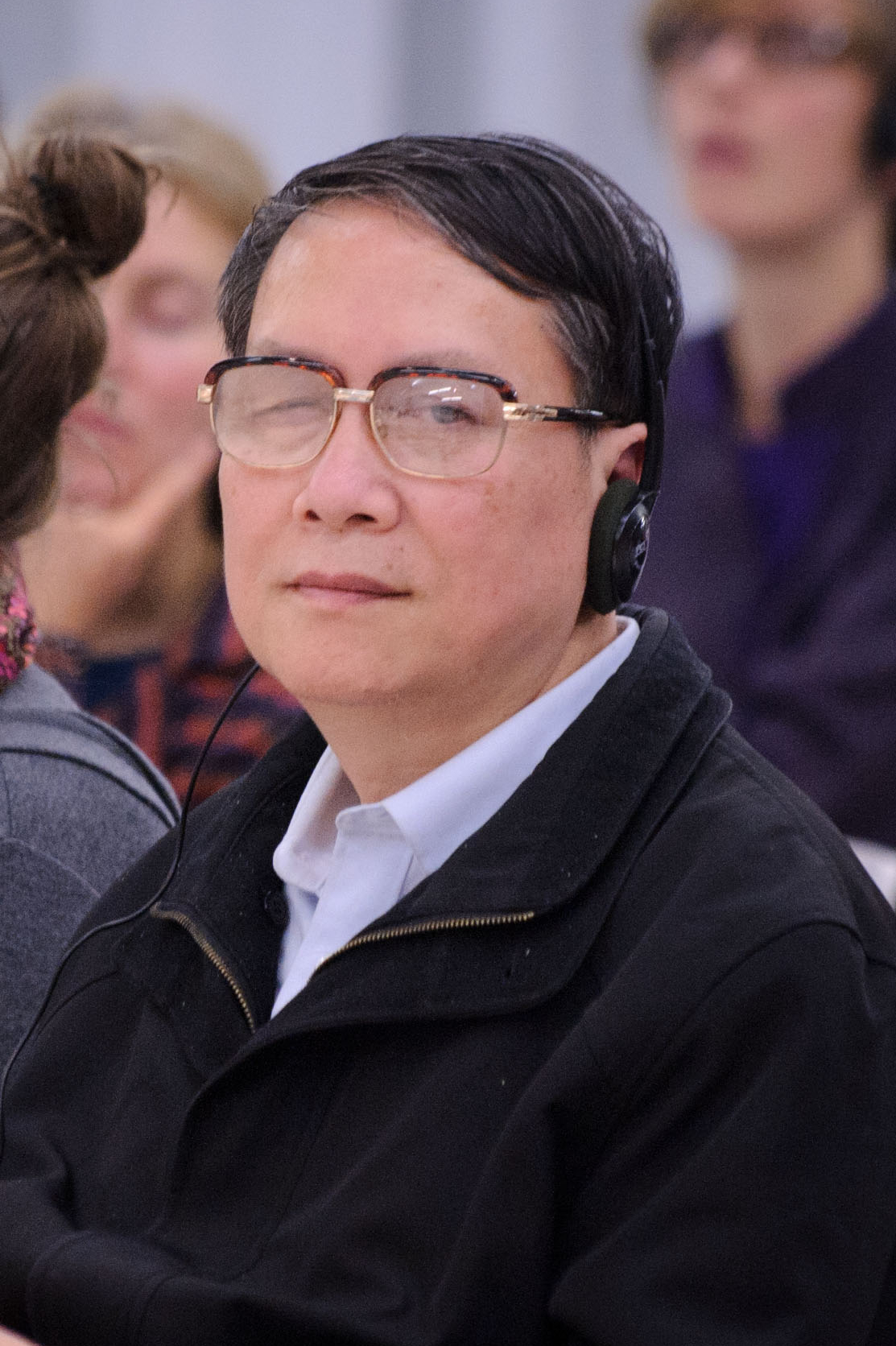
- 2011, Heinrich Böll Foundation, Germany
- Born: 28 December 1953 (age 72); Guilin, Guangxi, China
- Organization: Tsinghua University

Education
- Education: Lanzhou University

Philosophical work
- Era: 20th-/21st-century philosophy
- School: Liberalism

Qin Hui (Chinese: 秦晖; pinyin: Qín Huī; born December 1953) is a Chinese historian and public intellectual. He previously held the position of Professor of History, Institute of Humanities and Social Sciences, Tsinghua University, Beijing. He is now an adjunct professor in the Department of Government and Public Administration, at the Chinese University of Hong Kong.

== Life ==
Born in December 1953, he suffered from congenital glaucoma and was blind in his right eye right after birth. He sought medical treatment in Guangxi and Hunan, and finally underwent ophthalmic surgery at Fenyang Road Hospital (now the Eye and ENT Hospital of Fudan University) in Shanghai to save the vision in his left eye. But even after the surgery, Qin Hui's vision in his left eye was still poor due to the sequelae of optic nerve atrophy caused by congenital glaucoma.

At the beginning of the Cultural Revolution, Qin Hui was a first-year student at Nanning No. 4 Middle School. In 1967, when the province of Guangxi was divided into two major factions, Qin Hui became a member of the "Fourth Middle School Reform Union", the grass-roots organisation of the "Four Twenty-Two" faction of Guangxi in his school. In May 1968, he left Nanning and went with his mother to his grandmother's house in Ningbo, Zhejiang Province. From 1969 to 1978, he was embedded in a production team in Tianlin County, Guangxi, where he joined the Communist Youth League of China and Chinese Communist Party.

In 1978, Qin Hui passed the preliminary examination for postgraduate study, and was given 150 yuan by the authorities for travelling expenses to Lanzhou, where he passed the re-examination. Because of his poor eyesight, Lanzhou University tried to refuse to admit him, but at the insistence of his master's tutor, Zhao Lisheng (Chinese: 赵俪生), a pioneer in the history of the Chinese Peasant War and the history of the agrarian system, Qin Hui eventually managed to enrol at Lanzhou University. In 1981, Qin Hui received his master's degree in history from Lanzhou University.

In 1982, he taught at Shaanxi Normal University and was promoted to professor at Shaanxi Normal University in 1992. Qin's primary field is economic history and peasant studies. Since 1992 he has emerged as a prominent public intellectual, taking a stand on a range of issues, often in conflict with the official doctrines of the Chinese government. His general focus is China's agrarian history. Qin is a writer in the Sinosphere and the Chinese-speaking Internet, where collections of his works are commonly found. An important case in point is his doctrine of "issues versus isms."

Qin’s recent research includes three broad topics: China, globalization and the “new Cold War”; China’s social economy during the Cultural Revolution; and rethinking the lessons of the May Fourth Movement—what he calls “the failure of the second wave of global democratization.”

== Thought ==
In terms of political ideology, Qin Hui defends a left-liberal position. He favors privatization under strict conditions of democratic openness. However he opposes market fundamentalism in its Chinese forms, and seeks to introduce institutions of social democracy, including some aspects of the welfare state. He strongly defends liberty as a political value, and often allies with other Chinese intellectuals labeled "liberal". He has engaged in polemics with the Chinese New Left, particularly its more populist and nationalist forms. He has for example signed petitions protesting chauvinistic responses to the September 11 attacks in New York City.

In his analysis of political sentiment in contemporary China, Qin contends there is "overlapping consensus" between liberalism and social democracy and that the political differences between Chinese liberals and Chinese social democrats have not become an issue.

=== Peasant studies ===
In 1997, Qin Hui summarized the historical phenomenon of "peasant burdens becoming simpler only to become more complex again, leading to a rebound and becoming heavier with each reform" as the "Huang Zongxi's Law," which attracted the attention of Premier Wen Jiabao in 2003. China abolished agricultural taxes in 2006.

As a public intellectual, Qin has worked to initiate debates on social justice. Having himself been sent down to work as a peasant in a poor mountainous region of Southwest China in the Cultural Revolution, Qin has argued that China's peasantry suffers from a grave lack of social justice to the present day. At the same time, he has stated in his historical research that the peasantry has a strong tendency to enhance their citizen status whenever possible (whereas the urban working class has often tended to demand restitution of the dependent client status it enjoyed under the Maoist planned economy).

Qin has drawn on the work of Alexander Chayanov, Eric Wolf and other writers on agrarian society to attack cultural essentialism in studies of the Chinese peasantry, which often takes the form of portraying the peasantry as permanently imbued with Confucianism and the collectivist ethics of the feudal patriarchal lineage. Qin has been concerned to show that history rather than culture provides a solid explanatory framework for the empirical phenomena.

Contrary to the received Maoist view which emphasizes peasant wars as expressions of class struggle, in his research on agrarian history Qin concludes that the most significant fault-line in the countryside was not between peasant and landlord, but between peasant and official. This has obvious consequences for interpreting contemporary rural China.

=== Moving Away from the Imperial Regime ===
In December 2015, Qin Hui's new book Moving Away from the Imperial Regime (走出帝制; Zǒuchū Dìzhì), a collection of articles examining how the "dream" of constitutional democracy fell apart in China in the early 20th century after the country broke free from the Qing imperial order, was banned by the Chinese government. The book was a bestseller before the ban. "It's like they want to kill someone and won't even let him complain about it," Qin commented; "I can't talk about this matter." An anonymous employee at the book's publisher said that the book had "quality problems". The ban was issued days before China celebrated its second annual Constitution Day.

His view is that the end of apartheid in South Africa was followed by serious security challenges, which some interpreted as proof that democratic reforms were detrimental. Yet even so, support for reviving racial segregation has disappeared, including among white South Africans themselves. In a comparable way, after the 1911 Revolution, Chinese society decisively moved away from the imperial order. Despite the considerable disorder of the early Republic, any attempt to restore monarchy lacked legitimacy and found no meaningful public backing.

=== China Model ===
Qin Hui once spoke with various people in Germany, including Hans Modrow, the last Communist leader of East Germany. Modrow, despite his dissatisfaction with post-reunification outcomes, never believed East Germany could have prevailed over the West, noting that even under democracy the population gap alone made electoral victory impossible. Qin Hui then posed a hypothetical scenario: if Honecker had crushed the 1989 democratic movement and kept the Berlin Wall intact, East Germans would still lack political freedoms, but Honecker might have embraced market reforms for pragmatic reasons—turning East Germany into an authoritarian, low-cost production base economically tied to West Germany, with Western capital entering and inexpensive goods flowing out.

=== Trump ===
In Qin Hui’s view, longstanding left-wing and right-wing critiques claim that American democracy is manipulated by money and media, making it insincere. Yet the 2016 election showed a different pattern: Trump spent only a fraction of Clinton’s budget but still won, which weakens the argument that money determines the outcome. Major media organizations, political elites in both parties, major business sectors, and academia were overwhelmingly opposed to him, indicating that neither media nor establishment support dictated the result.

== Family ==
Qin Hui is married with one daughter. His wife, Jin Yan (金雁) is an eminent scholar of Eastern European and Russian affairs in her own right, often collaborating with Qin under the nom-de-plume Su Wen (苏文).

== See also ==
- Chinese philosophy
- Liberalism in China
