= Pythagoras number =

Number which describes the structure of the set of squares in a given field

In mathematics, the Pythagoras number or reduced height of a field describes the structure of the set of squares in the field. The Pythagoras number $p(K)$ of a field $K$ is the smallest positive integer $p$ such that every sum of squares in $K$ is a sum of $p$ squares.

A Pythagorean field is a field with Pythagoras number 1: that is, every sum of squares is already a square.

== Examples ==
- Every non-negative real number is a square, so $p(\R)=1$.
- For a finite field of odd characteristic, not every element is a square, but all are the sum of two squares, so $p=2$.
- By Lagrange's four-square theorem, every positive rational number is a sum of four squares, and not all are sums of three squares, so $p(\Q)=4$.

== Properties ==
- Every positive integer occurs as the Pythagoras number of some formally real field.
- The Pythagoras number is related to the Stufe by $p(F)\leq s(F)+1$. If $F$ is not formally real then $s(F)\leq p(F)\leq s(F)+1$, and both cases are possible: for $F=\C$ we have $s=p=1$, whereas for $F=\mathbb{F}_5$ we have $s=1$, $p=2$.
- As a consequence, the Pythagoras number of a non-formally-real field is either a power of 2, or 1 more than a power of 2. All such cases occur: i.e., for each pair $(s,p)$ of the form $(2^k,2^k)$ or $(2^k,2^k+1)$, there exists a field $F$ such that $(s(F),p(F)) = (s,p)$. For example,
  - quadratically closed fields and fields of characteristic 2 give $(s(F),p(F))=(1,1)$;
  - for primes $p\equiv 1\!\!\!\!\pmod{4}$, $\mathbb{F}_p$ and the p-adic field $\Q_p$ give $(1,2)$;
  - for primes $p\equiv 3\!\!\!\!\pmod{4}$, $\mathbb{F}_p$ gives $(2,2)$ and $\Q_p$ gives $(2,3)$;
  - $\Q_2$ gives $(4,4)$, and
  - the function field $\Q_2(t)$ gives $(4,5)$.
- The Pythagoras number is related to the height of a field $F$: if $F$ is formally real then $h(F)$ is the smallest power of 2 which is not less than $p(F)$; if $F$ is not formally real then $h(F)=2s(F)$.
