= Huang Zongxi's Law =

Economic theorem devised by Huang Zongxi

- Named after: Huang Zongxi
- Summarized by: Qin Hui
- Definition: "A vicious cycle in which attempts to alleviate rural taxes have led paradoxically to their growth"

Huang Zongxi's Law
- Simplified Chinese: 黄宗羲定律
- Traditional Chinese: 黃宗羲定律
Transcriptions
Standard Mandarin
- Hanyu Pinyin: Huángzōngxī dìng lǜ

Huang Zongxi's Law (simplified Chinese: 黄宗羲定律; traditional Chinese: 黃宗羲定律), or Theory of Huang Zongxi, is an observation made by Huang Zongxi (1610–1695) on how the burden of the peasants often increased rather than decreased during the various dynasties in Chinese history when attempts were made to reduce it. This theorem was summarized and named by the Chinese historian Qin Hui.

Qin Hui summarized Huang Zongxi's criticism of China's tax reforms of the past dynasties, exposing their shortcomings of "the ill of steady accumulation" (积累莫返之害) as the "Huang Zongxi's Law".

== Definition ==
All the previous reforms aimed at reducing the tax burden on the peasants eventually pushed up the tax burden on the peasants, which is known as "Huang Zongxi's Law".

== See also ==
- Tocqueville effect
- Jevons paradox
