= Machine Age =

Period of early 20th century history of rapid technological advancement

The Machine Age is an era that includes the early-to-mid 20th century, sometimes also including the late 19th century. An approximate dating would be about 1880 to 1945. Considered to be at its peak in the time between the first and second world wars, the Machine Age overlaps with the late part of the Second Industrial Revolution (which ended around 1914 at the start of World War I) and continues beyond it until 1945 at the end of World War II. The 1940s saw the beginning of the Atomic Age, where modern physics saw new applications such as the atomic bomb, the first computers, and the transistor. The Digital Revolution ended the intellectual model of the machine age founded in the mechanical and heralding a new more complex model of high technology. The digital era has been called the Second Machine Age, with its increased focus on machines that do mental tasks.

== Developments ==
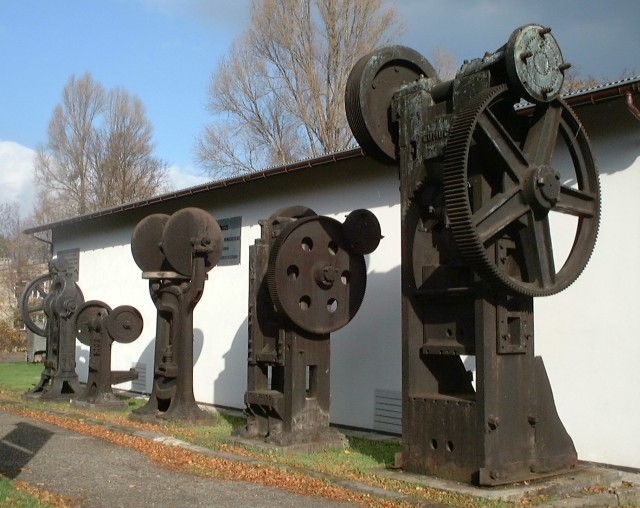
Metalworking machinery

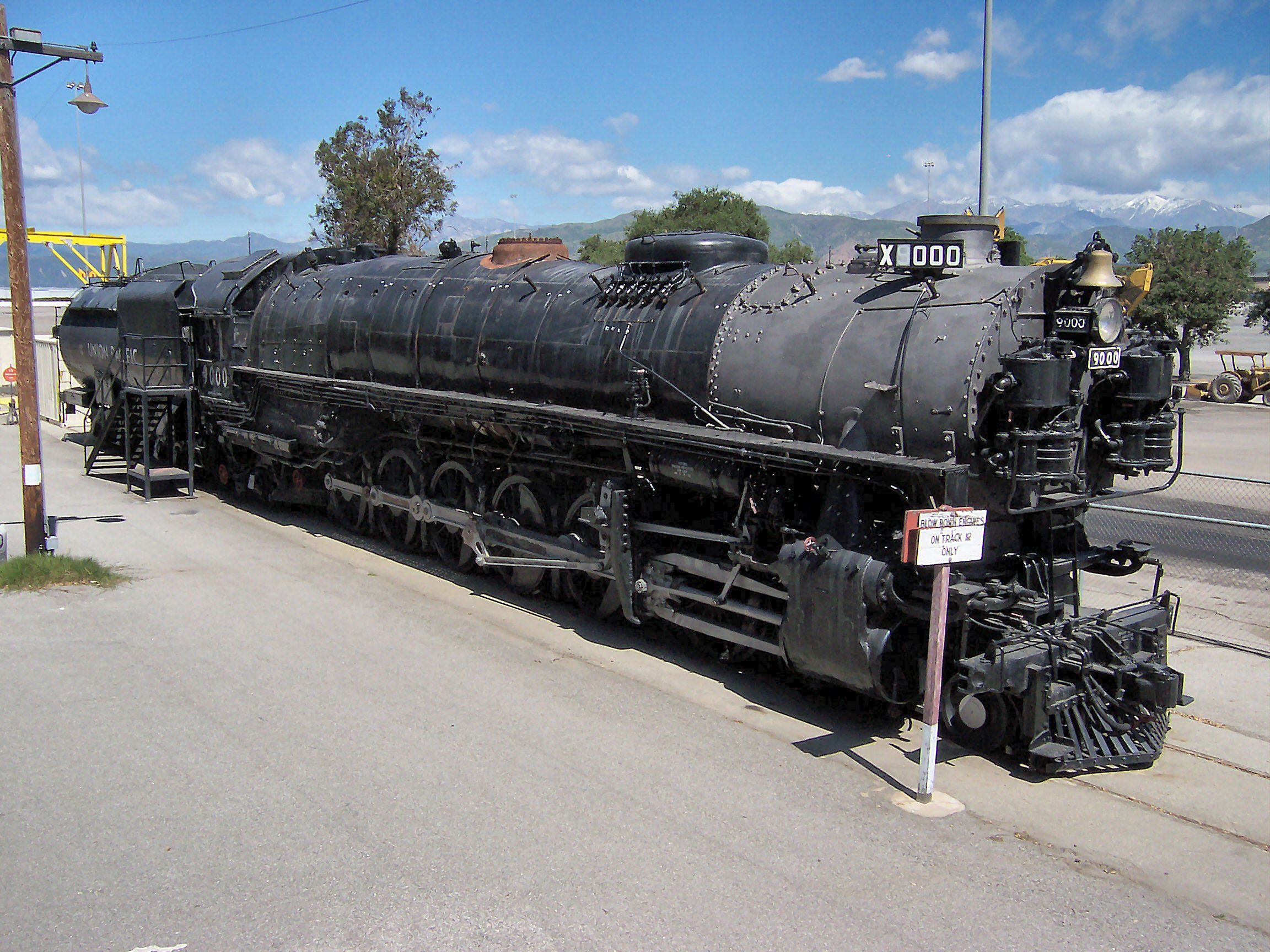
A freight locomotive

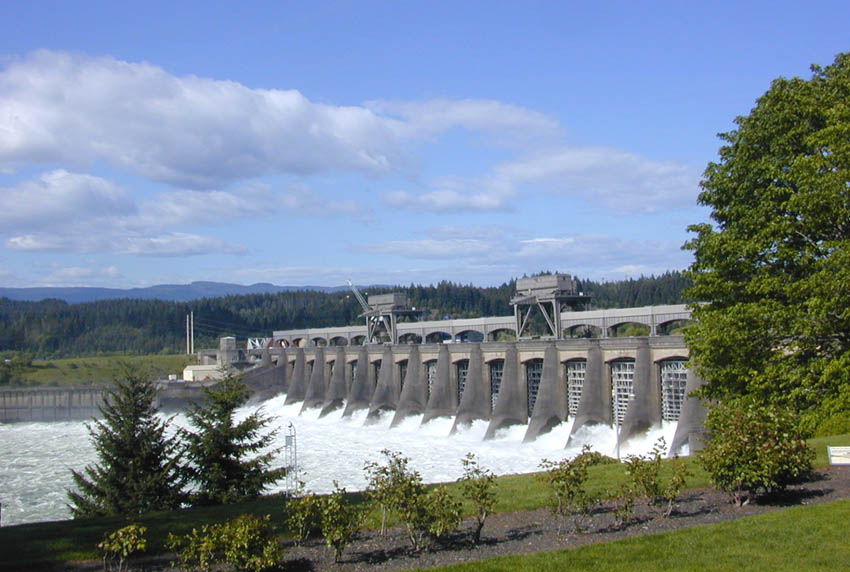
Bonneville Dam (1933–1937)

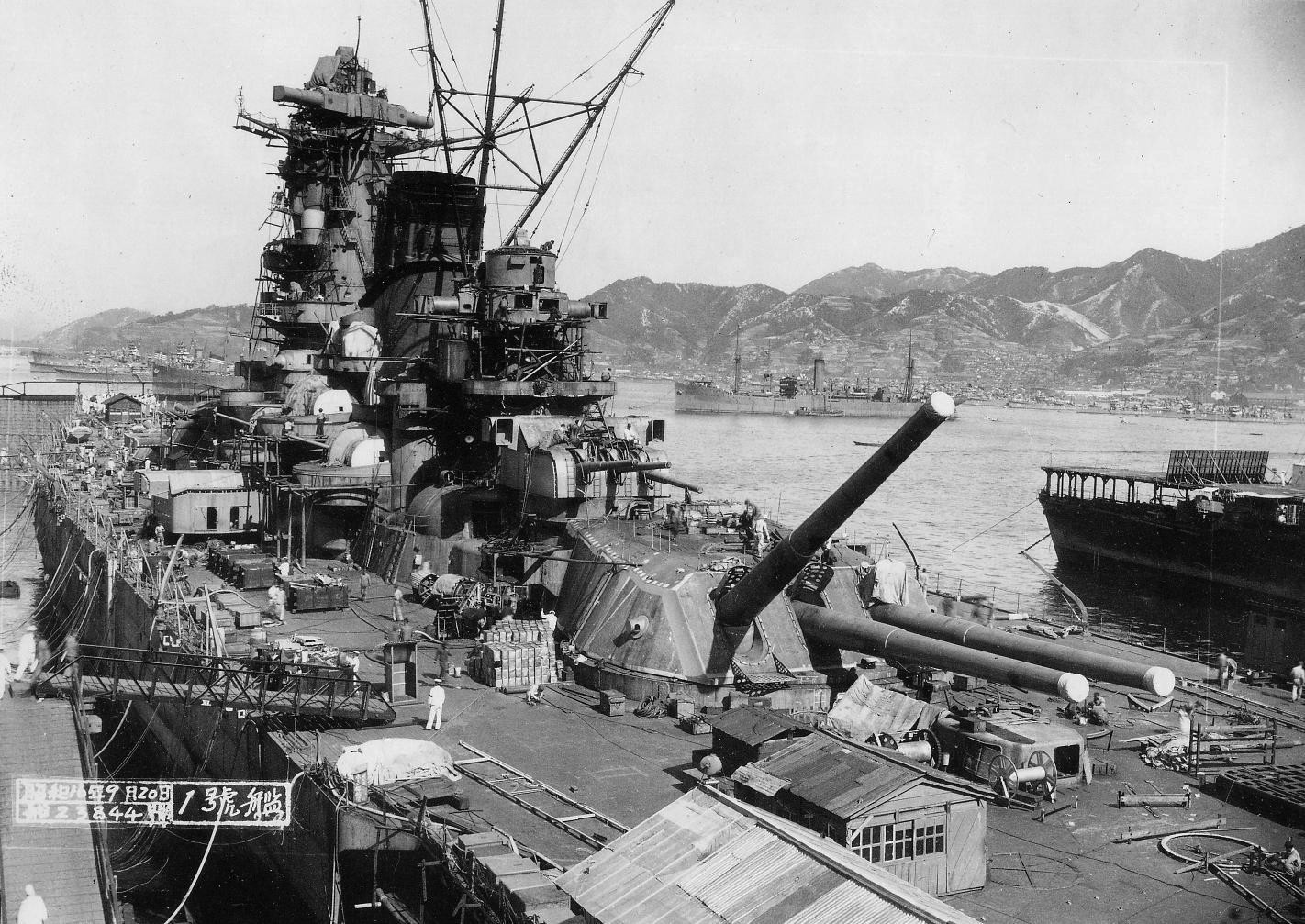
The Yamato and other battleships in World War II were the heaviest artillery-carrying ships ever launched. They proved inferior to aircraft carriers and missile-carrying warships.

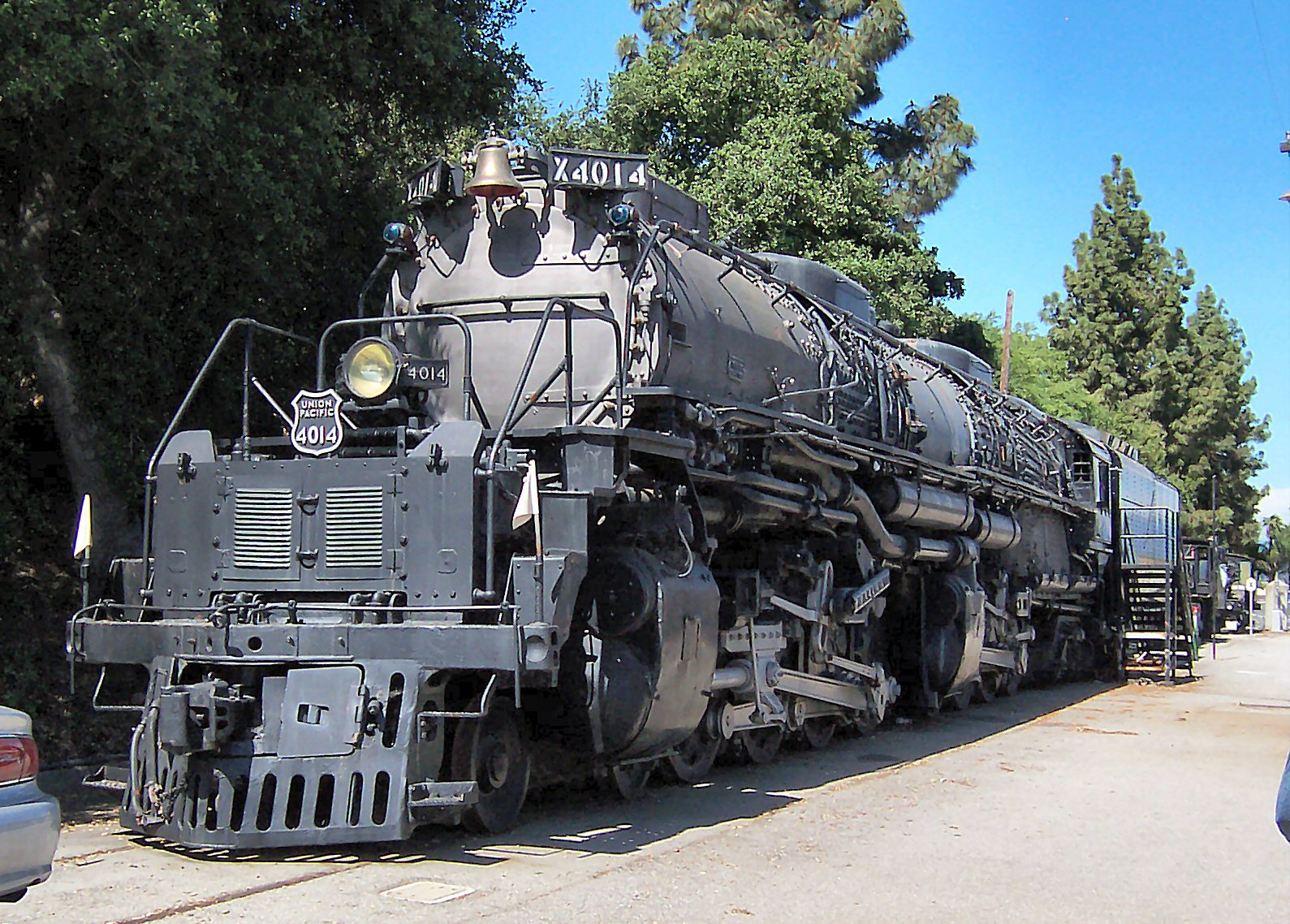
Some locomotives built in the mid-20th century were the heaviest ever.

Artifacts of the Machine Age include:

- Reciprocating steam engine replaced by gas turbines, internal combustion engines and electric motors
- Electrification based on large hydroelectric and thermal electric power production plants and distribution systems
- Mass production of high-volume goods on moving assembly lines, particularly of the automobile
- Gigantic production machinery, especially for producing and working metal, such as steel rolling mills, bridge component fabrication, and car body presses
- Powerful earthmoving equipment
- Steel-framed buildings of great height (skyscrapers)
- Radio and phonograph technology
- High-speed printing presses, enabling the production of low-cost newspapers and mass-market magazines
- Low cost appliances for the mass market that employ fractional power electric motors, such as vacuum cleaners and washing machines
- Fast and comfortable long-distance travel by railways, cars, and aircraft
- Development and employment of modern war machines such as tanks, aircraft, submarines and the modern battleship
- Streamline designs in cars and trains, influenced by aircraft design

== Social influence ==
- The rise of mass market advertising and consumerism
- Nationwide branding and distribution of goods, replacing local arts and crafts
- Nationwide cultural leveling due to exposure to films and network broadcasting
- Mass-produced government propaganda through print, audio, and motion pictures
- Replacement of skilled crafts with low skilled labor
- Growth of strong corporations through their abilities to exploit economies of scale in materials and equipment acquisition, manufacturing, and distribution
- Corporate exploitation of labor leading to the creation of strong trade unions as a countervailing force
- Aristocracy with weighted suffrage or male-only suffrage replaced by democracy with universal suffrage, parallel to one-party states
- First-wave feminism
- Increased economic planning, including five-year plans, public works and occasional war economy, including nationwide conscription and rationing

== Environmental influence ==
- Exploitation of natural resources with little concern for the ecological consequences; a continuation of 19th century practices but at a larger scale.
- Release of synthetic dyes, artificial flavorings, and toxic materials into the consumption stream without testing for adverse health effects.
- Rise of petroleum as a strategic resource

== International relations ==
- Conflicts between nations regarding access to energy sources (particularly oil) and material resources (particularly iron and various metals with which it is alloyed) required to ensure national self-sufficiency. Such conflicts were contributory to two devastating world wars.
- Climax of New Imperialism and beginning of decolonization

== Arts and architecture ==
Nude Descending a Staircase, No. 2 (1912) by Marcel Duchamp displays Cubist and Futurist characteristics.

The Machine Age is considered to have influenced:

- Dystopian films including Charlie Chaplin's Modern Times and Fritz Lang's Metropolis
- Streamline Moderne appliance design and architecture
- Bauhaus style
- Steampunk – Subgenre of science fiction
- Dieselpunk – Subgenre of science fiction
- Modern art
  - Cubism
  - Art Deco decorative style
  - Futurism
  - Music

== See also ==
- Industrial Revolution
- Second Industrial Revolution – 1870–1914 electrical and chemical era
- Information Age – Industrial shift to information technology (conjectured Third Industrial Revolution)
- Fourth Industrial Revolution
- Accelerating change
- Technological singularity
