= Stufe (algebra) =

In field theory, a branch of mathematics, the Stufe (German pronunciation: [ˈʃtuːfə]; German: "level") s(F) of a field F is the least number of squares that sum to −1. If −1 cannot be written as a sum of squares, s(F) = $\infty$. In this case, F is a formally real field. Albrecht Pfister proved that the Stufe, if finite, is always a power of 2, and that conversely every power of 2 occurs.

== Powers of 2 ==
If $s(F)\ne\infty$ then $s(F)=2^k$ for some natural number $k$.

Proof: Let $k \in \mathbb N$ be chosen such that $2^k \leq s(F) < 2^{k+1}$. Let $n = 2^k$. Then there are $s = s(F)$ elements $e_1, \ldots, e_s \in F\setminus\{0\}$ such that

$$0 = \underbrace{1 + e_1^2 + \cdots + e_{n-1}^2 }_{=:\,a} + \underbrace{e_n^2 + \cdots + e_s^2}_{=:\,b}\;.$$

Both $a$ and $b$ are sums of $n$ squares, and $a \ne 0$, since otherwise $s(F)< 2^k$, contrary to the assumption on $k$.

According to the theory of Pfister forms, the product $ab$ is itself a sum of $n$ squares, that is, $ab = c_1^2 + \cdots + c_n^2$ for some $c_i \in F$. But since $a+b=0$, we also have $-a^2 = ab$, and hence

$$-1 = \frac{ab}{a^2} = \left(\frac{c_1}{a} \right)^2 + \cdots + \left(\frac{c_n}{a} \right)^2,$$

and thus $s(F) = n = 2^k$.

== Positive characteristic ==
Any field $F$ with positive characteristic has $s(F) \leq 2$.

Proof: Let $p = \operatorname{char}(F)$. It suffices to prove the claim for $\mathbb F_p$.

If $p = 2$ then $-1 = 1 = 1^2$, so $s(F)=1$.

If $p>2$ consider the set $S=\{x^2 : x \in \mathbb F_p\}$ of squares. $S\setminus\{0\}$ is a subgroup of index $2$ in the cyclic group $\mathbb F_p^\times$ with $p-1$ elements. Thus $S$ contains exactly $\tfrac{p+1}2$ elements, and so does $-1-S$. Since $\mathbb F_p$ only has $p$ elements in total, $S$ and $-1-S$ cannot be disjoint, that is, there are $x,y\in\mathbb F_p$ with $S\ni x^2=-1-y^2\in-1-S$ and thus $-1=x^2+y^2$.

== Properties ==
The Stufe s(F) is related to the Pythagoras number p(F) by p(F) ≤ s(F) + 1. If F is not formally real then s(F) ≤ p(F) ≤ s(F) + 1. The additive order of the form (1), and hence the exponent of the Witt group of F is equal to 2s(F).

== Examples ==
- The Stufe of a quadratically closed field is 1.
- The Stufe of an algebraic number field is $\infty$, 1, 2 or 4 (Siegel's theorem). Examples are $\Q$, $\Q(\sqrt{-1})$, $\Q(\sqrt{-2})$ and $\Q(\sqrt{-7})$.
- The Stufe of a finite field $\mathbb{F}_q$ is 1 if q ≡ 1 mod 4 and 2 if q ≡ 3 mod 4.
- The Stufe of a local field of odd residue characteristic is equal to that of its residue field. The Stufe of the 2-adic field $\Q_2$ is 4.
