= James Chowning Davies =

American sociologist (1918–2012)

James Chowning Davies (May 6, 1918 – March 30, 2012) was an American sociologist and professor emeritus of political science at the University of Oregon. Davies is perhaps best known for his so-called "J curve" theory of political revolutions, which seeks to explain the rise of revolutionary movements in terms of rising individual expectations and falling levels of perceived well-being.

Davies asserts that revolutions are a subjective response to a sudden reversal in fortunes after a long period of economic growth. The theory is often applied to explain social unrest and efforts by governments to contain this unrest. This is referred to as the Davies' J-Curve, because economic development followed by a depression would be modeled as an upside down and slightly skewed J.

== Life ==
Davies earned his bachelor's degree from Oberlin College. He next went to study in law school at the University of Chicago. After completing a year of study there he entered the United States Army around the time the US entered World War II. The last part of his war service was in the United States occupation of Japan, where he worked in the office responsible for rebuilding the education system. He then resumed law school at the University of Texas, Austin for another year. He switched to studying political science, and received his Ph.D. from the University of California, Berkeley in 1952.

== Quote ==
"Revolutions are most likely to occur when a prolonged period of objective economic and social development is followed by a short period of sharp reversal. People then subjectively fear that ground gained with great effort will be quite lost; their mood becomes revolutionary. The evidence from the Dorr Rebellion, the Russian Revolution, and the Egyptian Revolution supports this notion; tentatively, so do data on other civil disturbances. Various statistics—as on rural uprisings, industrial strikes, unemployment, and cost of living—may serve as crude indexes of popular mood. More useful, though less easy to obtain, are direct questions in cross-sectional interviews. The goal of predicting revolution is conceived but not yet born or matured."

(From J. C. Davies: "Toward a theory of revolution") American Sociological Review 27(1962):5–19.

== Bibliography ==
- When Men Revolt and Why – A Reader in Political Violence and Revolution (The Free Press, 1971)
- Human Nature in Politics – The Dynamics of Political Behavior (Wiley, 1963)
