= Leveling mechanism =

Conceptual practice in cultural anthropology

In cultural anthropology, a leveling mechanism is a practice in some cultures which acts to ensure social equality, usually by shaming or humbling members of a group that attempt to put themselves above other members.

== ǃKung practice of shaming the meat ==
One commonly given example of a leveling mechanism is the ǃKung practice of "shaming the meat", particularly as illustrated by the Canadian anthropologist Richard Borshay Lee in his article "Eating Christmas in the Kalahari" (1969). When Lee gave the ǃKung an ox as a Christmas gift, the ǃKung responded by insulting the gift, calling it a "bag of bones" and joking that they would have to eat the horns because there was no meat on it. Lee later asked a man named Tomazo why his gift was insulted in this way. He responded that it was because the gift was arrogant. Lee asked what he meant by this and was told:

"Yes, when a young man kills much meat he comes to think of himself as a chief or a big man, and he thinks of the rest of us as his servants or inferiors. We can’t accept this. We refuse one who boasts, for someday his pride will make him kill somebody. So we always speak of his meat as worthless. This way we cool his heart and make him gentle."

— Tomazo, "Eating Christmas in the Kalahari"

== See also ==
- ǃKung people § Hunting rites
- Law of Jante
- Tall poppy syndrome
