= Level Vodka =

Swedish brand of vodka

Level Vodka, a brand of vodka from the makers of Absolut was launched in 2004. Made in Åhus, Sweden, the vodka is made from winter wheat and is marketed as "perfectly balanced" due to the use of two distinct distillation methods - a continuous distillation process to remove congeners, creating the vodka's smoothness, and a batch distillation process to add character.

Level was launched as a direct competitor to Grey Goose.

Level Vodka is no longer being produced.
