= Derived no-effect level =

The derived no-effect level (DNEL) is the level of exposure to a substance above which humans should not be exposed. The REACH regulation defines them as exposure levels beneath which a substance does not harm human health. According to the EU REACH legislation, manufacturers and importers of chemical substances are required to calculate DNELs as part of their chemical safety assessment (CSA) for any chemicals used in quantities of 10 tonnes or more per year. The DNEL is to be published in the manufacturer's chemical safety report (CSR) and, for hazard communication, in an extended safety data sheet.

Correspondent to REACH legislation, the registrant (manufacturer or importer) of a substance has to indicate the DNELs for the most probable way of exposition (oral, dermal, inhalative) and the expected frequency and duration of exposure. Depending on the way of exposure it can be necessary to specify different DNELs for affected persons (employees, consumer, children, pregnant women etc.). The way to determine a DNE, described in Annex I, 1.4., is predominantly based on toxicological assessments of the substances. If it is not possible to identify a DNEL, this has to be clearly stated and fully justified compliant with Annex I, 1.4.2.

The GESTIS DNEL list of the German Social Accident Insurance (DGUV) makes workplace-related DNELs available that have been established by manufacturers and importers on their own responsibility and are published in this form by the European Chemicals Agency (ECHA). The DGUV GESTIS DNEL list currently contains DNELs for workers (local and/or systemic effects during long-term inhalation exposure) for about 6,000 substances. Different DNELs for a single substance are presented side-by-side, carcinogens are specially marked. The DNEL list can be used for a risk assessment of tasks involving hazardous substances, for the specification of protective measures, and for the evaluation of their efficiency. Commercial use of data is prohibited without permission, and liability is excluded.
