= Cultural leveling =

Learning other cultures through travel and communication

Cultural leveling is the process by which different cultures approach each other as a result of travel and communication. It can also refer to "the process by which Western culture is being exported and diffused into other nations." Cultural leveling within the United States has been driven by mass market media such as radio and television broadcasting and nationwide distribution of magazines and catalogs. Some of these means and effects are considered artifacts of the Machine Age of the 1920s and 1930s. Today the interactions between countries worldwide have allowed the opportunity for intercultural dialogue.

Countries worldwide have undergone forms of cultural leveling. Some countries being more open to it than others. Japan, for example, has assimilated Western styles of dress and music into a blend or Western and Eastern Cultures. Today, due to the crossing or travel and communication with time and space there is just about no "other side of the world" anymore, giving us the inevitable result of what is known as cultural leveling. Eclecticism and cultural leveling both share a similar ideology in the separation of culture from human nature creating the potential risk or enslavement and manipulation.

Cultural leveling is notably present in minorities instead of large cultures driven to aspire wealth and there is more commonality present in minorities. At times countercultures and subcultures may pose as a resistance to cultural change within society. Local cultures did diffuse across each other in earlier times as material items hence influencing a change in the cultural atmosphere. These diffusions have been part of most significant cultural changes in recorded history. To convey how fundamental the loss of diversity and the subsequent leveling have been, many sociologists such as Daniel Lerner amplified the opinion through the phrase "the passing of traditional society."

== Relativism and cultural leveling seen as double threat ==
Baku (2009) asserted that relativism enables diverse cultures to coexist. Meanwhile, cultural leveling eliminates the cultural differences that make a person unique. Further more there has seen to be a "commercialization of cultural exchange: that of cultural eclecticism and that of cultural leveling." Cultural leveling results in the standardization of behaviors and lifestyles which sets out to create the danger for losing the significance of cultures and traditions of different countries. Danger lies within cultural leveling such that indiscriminate acceptance of types of conduct and lifestyles. In this way one loses sight of the profound significance of the different nations, of the traditions of the various people, by which the individuals define himself in relation to life's fundamental questions.

== Transnationality of people, places and cultures ==
It is evident that today that both local and global personal interconnectedness is becoming increasingly opaque.

=== Der Querschnitt ===
The golden years of the Der Querschnitt ranged from 1924 to 1929 when it was edited and achieved the cosmopolitism of its contributions by Hermann von Wedderkop. The journal of the Der Querschnitt contained comparisons of cultures, places and religions followed by the pace in which cultural leveling was progressing within a global perspective. The Der Querschnitt makes the concept of cultural leveling quite easy to identify. The Querschnitt is not only a European journal, but a cosmopolitan one as well as it represents contemporary trends both older and newer. By the end of the twenties, people at both ends of the social scale danced to the same rhythms and listened to the same hit songs as high culture was replaced with a popular new version of the high art of reality, the music of mass entertainment, jazz, and the cinema. These new trendy concepts claimed that boxing and jazz were the only interesting art forms of the modern age and "negro music" set the standards for what was new and stimulating. These different changes were seen to be successful mainly because modernity in cities and regions and the interchangeable aspects of modern life fascinated individuals and provided them with a brand new way of life.

== Cultural products in Balkan countries ==
In the 1920s, cities in the Balkans underwent substantial changes. As a Japanese journalist reports, most of the hairstyles we know today were adopted from the styles and fashion from Tokyo. The hairstyle known as the bob cut used to be known as the new Geisha hair cut originating in Tokyo. The entire region between Budapest and Istanbul displayed similar lifestyles of "jazz bands, gramophones, Chaplin posters, international press, nudist magazines from Berlin, comics from Paris, taxis, symptoms of women’s emancipation in the Turkish-Levantine salons." Mass-produced goods and multicultural unreality of everyday are two aspects of global cultural leveling displayed in the Balkans. With all the chaotic co-existence of cultural products in the Balkans, reports have stated that it however does not actually frighten the visitor and that people should deal with the chaos of transnational influences that they are suddenly exposed to in the course of time.

== National resistance against international modernization ==
Reports from cities such as Prague and Budapest showed odd mannerisms and resistance toward modernization during a period of transition, as old European traditions, legends and monuments are deeply rooted in Prague. Reports on Prague's sense of national folklore and Budapest's ambivalent modernity demonstrate how the world's old continent cities cope with cultural leveling. The German, along with foreign correspondents typically tend to share the "New Sobriety’s" fascination with cultural leveling, while America was consistently referred to as the "cultural model of the future". Mass culture and technological modernity are typically adopted by large major cities however old traditions place a strain on some cities when it comes to adapting to new trends. Capital cities tend to imitate each other during the spread of cultural modernity. For example, "in European capital cities, London was in the shadow of Berlin’s progressive modernity, while prior to that Berlin was in the shadow of Paris."

== Economic leveling process ==
Jewish scholar Erich Auerbach wrote in Mimesis: The Representation of Reality in Western Literature that during the Second World War: "Beneath the conflicts, and also through them, an economic and cultural leveling process is taking place. It is still a long way to a common life of mankind on earth, but the goal begins to be visible." Still, half a century later one hesitates to describe the globalization that was taking place as an "economic leveling process." Meanwhile, Auerbach looked at cultural leveling with growing worry, however it was an unquestionable reality yet difficult to grasp. "In an essay published in 1952, Auerbach remarked that Goethe’s concept of “Weltliteratur [lit. World Literature]” had become increasingly inadequate, explaining the difficulty of a philologist from a single cultural tradition to be able to approach a world in which so many languages and so many cultural traditions interact." Erich Auerbach goes into depth about his belief that one must look for both starting points and concrete details from which the "global process can be inductively reconstructed." In the conclusion to Auerbach's Mimesis, he stated "The ongoing unification of the world is most concretely visible now in the unprejudiced, precise, interior and exterior representation of the random moment in the lives of different people." It is the same kind of class struggle approach in the cultural field that they had taken in the economic field, assembling the shortcoming against the privileged. Cultural leveling efforts were forcefully resumed during the early age among many individuals.

== Religion ==
Religion has always been a main source of cultural change and disruption. Numerous theoretical strategies have been used to explain religion and its role in society. But, in this age of consequent cultural leveling, no theory of religion would be complete if it failed to include the impact of cultural change on religions and the individuals who follow them. Karl Marx, in the words of Brian Morris, believed that "religion was, in a sense, a secondary phenomenon and depended on socioeconomic circumstances. It could only be overcome, therefore, when the circumstances that gave rise to religion were themselves transformed." According to A.R. Radcliffe-Brown, "religion is a storehouse for the mores and ethics conducive to a well-functioning society and embodies truth and meaning, and the individual's role is merely one of assimilating the existing belief system."

== Negative and positive outcomes of cultural leveling ==
Consequently, through the development of cultural leveling it is evident that some of the negative impacts are the disappearance of dialect in the aspect where individuals who spoke different language gradually disappear as the society acknowledges one language. Other negative outcomes include: the reduction of cultural diversity where individuals lose the significance of being different, loss of cultural uniqueness, loss of cultural heritage, and struggle of accepting the results of cultural leveling. Some positive outcomes of cultural leveling include: uniformity, cooperation, and efficient work(common understanding across the board). Cultural leveling influences cultural aspects to unfold what challenges the present precepts of society.

== Cultural leveling and Marxism ==
Communist leaders pursued cultural leveling not only because they remained committed to the Marxist doctrine of eliminating class distinctions, but also because of the distrust the old elites and were determined to prevent them from maintaining and reproducing their class advantage.

- Cultural appropriation
- Cultural assimilation
