= The Levels =

The Levels may refer to:

- One of several areas of flat, low-lying land in England:
  - The Somerset Levels
  - The North Somerset Levels or Avon Levels
  - The Minsmere Levels
- A former name for the suburb of Mawson Lakes, South Australia
