= Collective self-esteem =

Psychological concept

Collective self-esteem is a concept originating in the field of psychology that describes the aspect of an individual's self-image that stems from how the individual interacts with others and the groups that the individual is a part of. The idea originated during the research of Jennifer Crocker, during which she was trying to learn about the connection between a person's self-esteem and their attitude towards or about the group that the person is part of.

Collective self-esteem is talked about subjectively as a concept as well as measured objectively with various scales and assessments. The data from such research is used practically to give importance and weight to the idea that most individuals benefit from being in a group setting for at least sometime as well as being able to identify with being a part of a group. Or not.

== History ==
Jennifer Crocker and Riia Luhtanen were the first to study collective self-esteem. They believed there was a relationship between people's self-esteem and how they felt about groups they were a part of. Crocker hypothesized that people who were high in the trait of collective self-esteem would be more likely to “react to threats to collective self-esteem by derogating out-groups and enhancing the in-group.” The idea of collective self-esteem rose out of social identity theory (Tajfel & Turner). Social identity theory focused on an individual's personal beliefs about themselves and beliefs that stemmed from the groups they were part of. Collective self-esteem described a more group-oriented idea of self-esteem. It focused more on how groups, when they are threatened or perceive to be threatened will increase bias in favor of the in-group and increase prejudice toward the out-group. Crocker published a paper titled “Collective self-esteem and in-group bias.” It was published in the Journal of Personality and Social Psychology. Crocker developed a scale that consisted of four categories to measure collective self-esteem.

1. Private collective self-esteem – positive evaluation of one's group.
2. Membership esteem – how one sees themselves in a group. Are they a good member?
3. Public collective self-esteem – how the group one belongs to is evaluated by others.
4. Importance to identity – how important membership in a group is to self-concept.

The study concluded that prejudice and discrimination toward out-groups were not so much motivated by personal self-esteem needs but rather they were attempts to increase or enhance collective self-esteem.

== Research ==
=== Collective Self-Esteem Scale ===
The Collective Self-Esteem Scale (CSES) was developed by Luhtanen and Crocker as a measure to assess individuals’ social identity based on their membership in ascribed groups such as race, ethnicity, gender, and the like. The CSES has been one of the most widely used instruments in the field of psychology to assess collective group identity among racial and ethnic populations. In the initial CSES development study, exploratory factor analysis (EFA) and confirmatory factor analysis (CFA) techniques were used to examine the underlying factor structure of the proposed four-factor CSES. The preliminary prototype of the CSES consisted of 43 items. To shorten the instrument, Crocker and Luhtanen selected the four items with the highest factor loadings from each subscale to represent the final 16-item CSES. The actual scale is a list of statements that pertain to the person's membership in a group or category and each is rated on a seven-point scale. The scoring is done through four subscales that are categorized as follows: 1) Items 1, 5, 9, and 13 = Membership self-esteem. 2) Items 2, 6, 10, and 14 = Private collective self-esteem. 3) Items 3, 7, 11, and 15 = Public collective self-esteem. 4) Items 4, 8, 12, and 16 = Importance to identity. First, reverse-score answers to items 2,4, 5, 7, 10, 12, 13, and 15, such that (1=7), (2=6), (3=5), (4=4), (5=3), (6=2), (7=1). Then sum the answers to the four items for each respective subscale score, and divide each by four. Because the subscales measure distinct construct, it is strongly recommended against creating an overall or composite score for collective self-esteem.

=== Race ===
In the context of cross-cultural research using the CSES, Crocker Luhtanen, Blaine, and Broadnax explored the nature of collective self-esteem in Asian, Black, and White college students. Crocker et al. found that collective self-esteem was a significant predictor of psychological adjustment and that among the Black students in their sample, the correlation between public and private collective self-esteem was essentially zero. Based on this later finding, Crocker et al. surmised that Black college students might separate how they privately feel about their group from how they believe others may evaluate them. This separation between public and private evaluations may represent an important survival strategy for Black Americans because of the prejudice and discrimination they face in the United States. The literature has suggested that Black Americans may generally feel good about their own racial group but still believe that external perceptions of their racial group may be negative or derogatory. This phenomenon might indicate a CSES factor structure for Black Americans that is different from that of other racial or ethnic groups in the United States.

=== In-group and out-group bias ===
Cremer et al. began a study expecting that people high in CSE engaged in indirect enhancement of the in-group. This finding suggests that predictions made by Social Identity Theory are more applicable to individuals with a high level of CSE. In this study, Cremer et al. found that participants identified more with the in-group than with the out-group. Participants high in CSE evaluated in-group members as fairer and more competent than participants low in CSE. Cremer et al. also found that women expressed a higher level of CSE than men. These findings provide additional evidence that individuals high in CSE are more likely to engage in in-group distorting evaluations when there is a possible threat to their CSE. Applying the CSE scale in situations of a potential threat to the in-group (i.e., success or failure feedback), Crocker and Luhtanen found that, in contrast to people low in CSE, people high in CSE showed in-group favoritism, thereby indirectly enhancing the in-group. Individuals high in CSE will evaluate in-group members more positively than those low in CSE. The results concerning the in-group and outgroup evaluations seem to suggest that people with high CSE can be considered more confident about their esteemed social identity, making them search for more opportunities to enhance the collective self. As a result, those people will feel a greater need to evaluate their in-group members more positively (i.e., in-group favoritism) than people low in CSE. On the other hand, people low in CSE do not feel very confident about their social identity and, in order to avoid failure, they will consider out-group derogation as a more useful strategy to protect their social identity.

== Real-world application ==
Collective self-esteem can be seen in real-world applications through the use of BIRGing and CORFing. Both different concepts but both effect and incorporate collective self-esteem into our everyday lives.

BIRGing (basking in reflected glory) is when a person uses the association of another person's success to boost their own self-esteem or self-glory. The act of BIRGing is often used to offset any threats made to a person's or a group's self-esteem. Sometimes, this act is actually made unknowingly and unintentional. An example of BIRGing can be seen when your favorite sports team, say the University of Kansas men's basketball team, has just won the national title. You will notice when walking around campus or reading the local newspaper, you will be more likely to hear or read “We won!” or “We are the champs!” instead of "KU won!"

CORFing (cutting off reflected failure) can be seen in this same example, except when the team suffers a loss, the fans will change “we” to “they”. For example, “They did not show enough heart” or “They really got outplayed today”.

When someone uses BIRGing or CORFing, their collective self-esteem will be altered in either a positive or negative way and one must not only be careful on the frequency they are using these techniques, but also that these are often used unintentionally and can be taken out of context in many situations. In an article titled “BIRGing and CORFing: From the Hardcourt to the Boardroom” by Kevin Meyer, the author provides an example of BIRGing and CORFing being used in the workplace for job security. This can be seen when an employee aligns them self only with good projects or products and distances them self from poor outcomes and products. Employees must be careful when using these techniques often, because their coworkers may start to believe that that individual is only doing certain things to benefit themself and as Meyer states “throwing us under the bus” when hard times arise. Meyer also states “An effective leader must be willing to weather the storm, sharing in the collective successes but also standing up for their team when things don't go to plan. For most, BIRG and CORF can be more difficult to accomplish in the workplace as our affiliation with a particular team or project is often more obvious”.

== See also ==
- In-group favoritism
- Social identity theory
