= Leveling and sharpening =

Leveling and sharpening are two functions that are automatic and exist within memory. Sharpening is usually the way people remember small details in the retelling of stories they have experienced or are retelling those stories. Leveling is when people keep out parts of stories and try to tone those stories down so that some parts are excluded. Therefore, it makes it easier to fill in the memory gaps that exist.

== Explanation ==
According to a study conducted by psychologists in 1945 leveling and sharpening is involved in the retelling of stories. A person retelling the story about Noah's Ark might do it in the following way:

"There was a world filled with sin, where God could not find one virtuous man but one, Noah. God descended to him and said: "This sinful world is coming to an end. You must build a giant vessel for me so that only the most virtuous specimen can survive." Noah tried to warn mankind, but all they did was mock him and his project of building a colossal boat. They went on as usual: They murdered, stole, embezzled and acted in all other sorts of wicked behavior.

A pair of each of the finest animals in the world came to Noah and his boat. The animals traveled in one row. Noah said to his peers "This is a divine sign! You must come with me on my boat because something terrible will happen". But no one believed him. So the whole of humanity, except Noah's family, was drowned in a giant flooding that God had summoned. And all animals except one couple of every species drowned as well. For months Noah sailed the seas. One day when he was removing the covering of the ark, he noticed how the water no longer seemed as deep. The ark eventually landed on firm soil, and from there a new mankind and animal kingdom arose."

This retelling of the story of Noah's ark includes sharpening. Vivid details are retroactively added in the storytelling. Noah's interaction with the rest of the mankind and its explicit portrayal as wicked is not included in the Bible.

This version also includes leveling. Events in the original story are excluded and altered. According to the Bible, Noah sent out birds from his boat to try to discover if there was land. First he sent a raven, which kept returning home to the ark and then again flying out into the sea. When the raven no longer returned, he sent a dove which returned with an olive leaf. In the story given here it is portrayed as if God summoned a flood from nowhere, instead of first making it rain as it is described in the Bible.

== See also ==
- "The Death of the Author"
