= Tall poppy syndrome =

Aversion to the success of one's peers

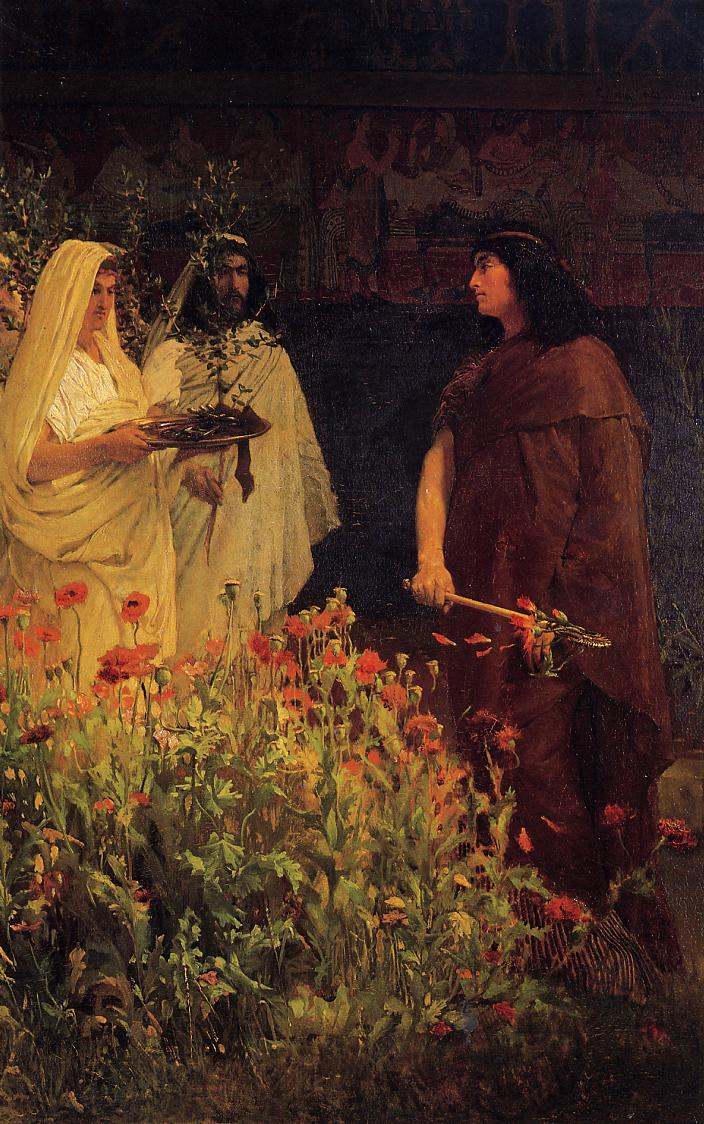
Tarquinius Superbus by Lawrence Alma-Tadema, depicting the king sweeping the tallest heads from a patch of poppies

Tall poppy syndrome is a term that originated in Australia and New Zealand in the 1980s that refers to people with notable public success or achievements that are ostracised by others as a form of egalitarianism. Intense scrutiny and criticism of such a person is termed as "cutting down the tall poppy".

== Etymology ==
The phrase "tall poppies" originates from Roman historian Livy's account of the tyrannical Roman king Lucius Tarquinius Superbus. He is said to have received a messenger sent by his son, Sextus Tarquinius, asking what he should do next in Gabii, since he had become all-powerful there. Rather than answering the messenger verbally, Tarquin went into his garden, took a stick and swept it across his garden, thus cutting off the heads of the tallest poppies that were growing there. The messenger returned to Gabii and told Sextus what he had seen. Sextus realised that his father wished him to put to death all of the most eminent people of Gabii, which he then did.

Earlier stories with the same theme are found in Aristotle's Politics (in which Periander, the tyrant of Corinth, makes the gesture to a herald of Thrasybulus, tyrant of Miletus) and in Herodotus' Histories (in which Thrasybulus makes the gesture to Periander's herald). However, these Greek stories involve fields of grain; Livy's Roman tale is the first to feature poppies.

== Australia and New Zealand ==
In Australia and New Zealand, "cutting down the tall poppy" is sometimes used by business entrepreneurs to describe those who criticise other people for their success and achievements. It has been described as being the by-product of the Australian and New Zealand cultural value of egalitarianism.

In New Zealand, academic study concerning the prevalence of tall poppy syndrome and its impact on the economy of New Zealand has become an area of increased focus. Interest in the effects of tall poppy syndrome became reinvigorated in 2021 following the suicide of entrepreneur Jake Millar, who had received negative media coverage surrounding one of his start-up companies. While research is limited, a handful of studies into the economic impact of tall poppy syndrome conducted throughout the 2020s have shown a negative impact on entrepreneurship, risk-taking, and overall economic growth in New Zealand.

== In other countries ==
In Japanese confucianism, a similar common expression is "the nail that sticks up gets hammered down" (出る杭は打たれる).

In the Netherlands, this expression is "to stick up above ground level" (boven het maaiveld uitsteken), with the cultural phenomenon being named maaiveldcultuur.

In Chile, this expression is known as chaquetear ('pull the jacket').

In Scandinavia, this expression is known as the Law of Jante, a phrase that originates from a 1933 satirical novel by Aksel Sandemose. It is a code that contains rules and stipulations such as "you're not to think you are anything special" and "perhaps you don't think we know a few things about you?".

In Canada, the term "tall poppy syndrome" is used in particular to refer to successful women being criticised for their success.

== See also ==
- Anti-intellectualism
- Crab mentality
- Discrimination of excellence
- Leveling mechanism
- Negative selection (politics)
- Overachievement
- Schadenfreude
- Taking the piss
- The Moral Basis of a Backward Society
