= Leveling (philosophy) =

Concept in philosophy

Leveling is a social process in which the uniqueness of the individual is rendered non-existent by assigning equal value to all aspects of human endeavors, thus missing all the intricacies and subtle complexities of human identity. Leveling is highly associated with existential philosopher Søren Kierkegaard.

== Overview ==
For Kierkegaard, leveling was the process of suppressing individuality to a point where the individual's uniqueness becomes non-existent and nothing meaningful in his existence can be affirmed:

Leveling at its maximum is like the stillness of death, where one can hear one's own heartbeat, a stillness like death, into which nothing can penetrate, in which everything sinks, powerless. One person can head a rebellion, but one person cannot head this leveling process, for that would make him a leader and he would avoid being leveled. Each individual can in his little circle participate in this leveling, but it is an abstract process, and leveling is abstraction conquering individuality.

— Søren Kierkegaard, The Present Age, translated by Alexander Dru with Foreword by Walter Kaufmann, 1962, pp. 51–53

However, Kierkegaard's idea of leveling wasn't one of making life meaningless but of making life equal because every single individual has equal access to the grace and gifts of God. He wasn't concerned with earthly and material goods.

The more a person weans his soul from understanding the imperfect to grasping the perfect, the more he will appropriate the explanation of life that comforts while it is day and remains with him when night comes, when he lies forgotten in his grave and has himself forgotten what moth and rust have consumed and human sagacity has found out, and yet he will have a thought that can fill out the long interval for him, that will know nothing of the difference that troubled him but is aware only of the equality that is from above, the equality in love, which lasts and is the only thing that lasts, the equality that does not allow any human being to be another’s debtor, except as Paul says, in the one debt, the debt of loving one another. — Eighteen Upbuilding Discourses by Søren Kierkegaard, ed. by Howard Vincent Hong and Edna Hatlestad Hong, 1992, p. 158

German philosopher Martin Heidegger wrote of leveling: "by averageness and leveling down, everything gets obscured, and what has thus been covered up gets passed off as something familiar and accessible to everyone. ...by virtue of an insensitivity to all distinctions in level and genuineness, and in providing average intelligibility, opens up a standard world in which all distinctions between the unique and the general, the superior and the average, the important and the trivial have been leveled".

Heidegger's view of important things becoming mundane and non-specific points towards Nietzsche's concept of master–slave morality, in which the weak and disenfranchised reframe the positive traits of the strong and powerful as not worth pursuing.

== See also ==
- Existentialism
- Nihilism
- Present age
- Law of Jante
