= Self-worth theory of motivation =

Motivational theory

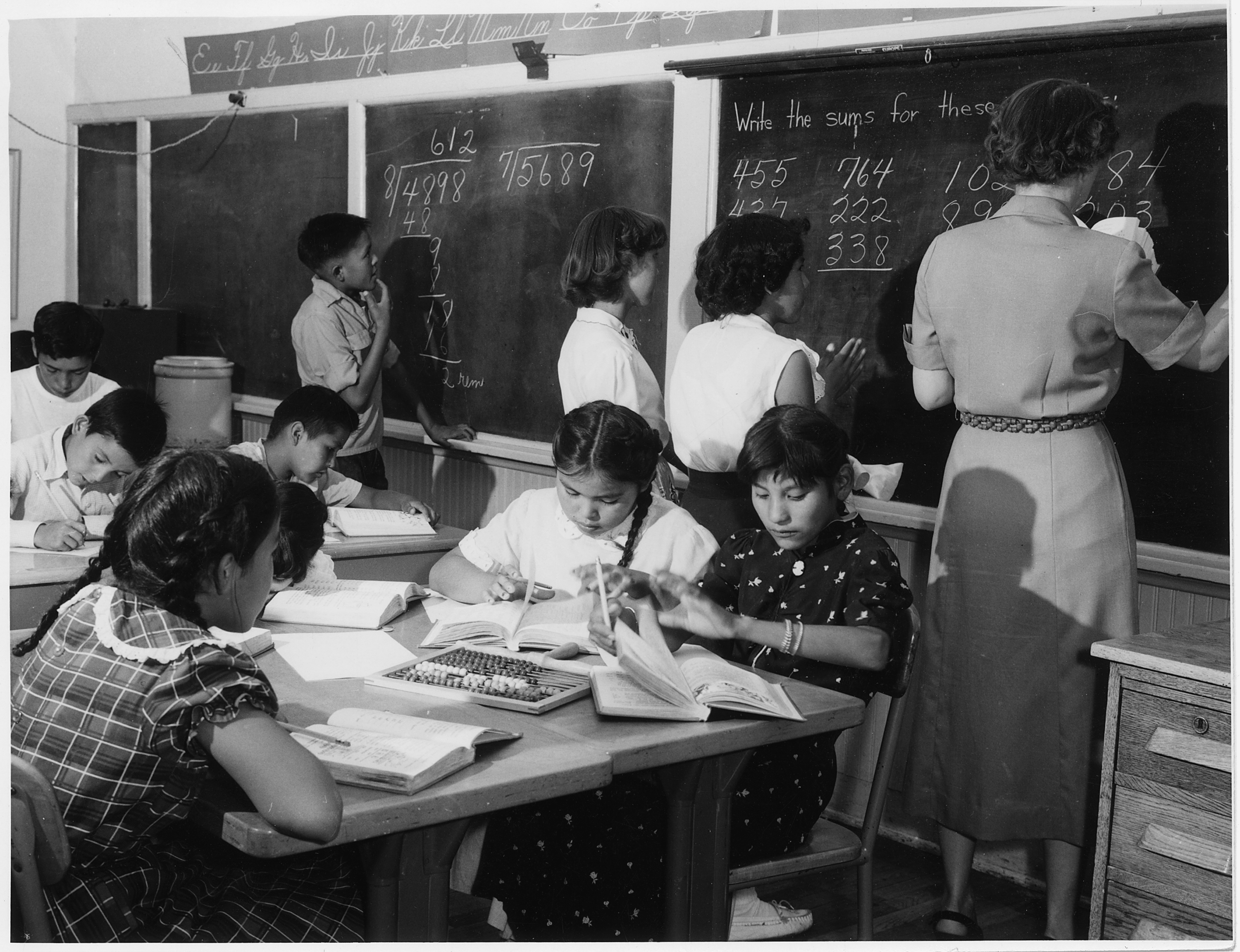
The self-worth theory of motivation commonly applies to students in the school context where frequent evaluation of one's ability and comparison between peers exist.

The self-worth theory of motivation, which is adapted from the original theory of achievement motivation, describes an individual's tendency to protect their sense of self-worth as the motive of avoiding failure and hence approaching success. Such theory commonly applies to students in the school context where frequent evaluation of one's ability and comparison between peers exist. A majority of students believe that being academically competent is a way of maintaining self-esteem, thus try to maximise their academic competence and avoid failure. The effort an individual puts in for the maximisation of academic competence to protect self-worth is often defined as a “double-edged sword”; while it is an essential factor of success, it can also result in feelings of worthlessness and incapability if one fails. To avoid the conclusion of incapability and hence maintain self-worth, some students choose to use defensive strategies such as putting in less effort and setting low standards towards the event of evaluation. These strategies, which support the maintenance of self-worth, are called self-handicapping and defensive pessimism respectively.

== Self-handicapping ==
The strategy of self-handicapping allows an individual to justify failure by deliberately placing an obstacle on their way to success. In this way, an individual can blame the obstacle instead of one's inability when the outcome of their performance is unsatisfactory. Typical ways of self-handicapping include procrastination, reduction of effort or not willing to practice for upcoming tasks. Such performance-avoidance goals have a negative impact on an individual's attainment of performance. Thus, the strategy of self-handicapping has several negative consequences, including “low performance attainment, academic dissatisfaction, and subjective well-being,” as well as the positive consequence of protecting self-esteem. Additionally, unlike the strategy of defensive pessimism, self-handicapping is more about avoiding failure rather than approaching success. It usually occurs in circumstances where individuals put the avoidance of failure over successful performance.

The self-presented dimension of self-handicapping also has been introduced. This self-reported strategy includes the exaggeration of obstacles that could impede successful performance, excuses of test anxiety and health-related problems.

== Defensive pessimism ==
In order to avoid the negative implication of failure on one's sense of self-worth, some students use the strategy of defensive pessimism; they deliberately have pessimistic thoughts about the upcoming tasks. This involves the establishment of low goals and low expectations towards the tasks for which one's ability will be evaluated. Establishing lower, thus safer, goals, which is achieved by lowering the standard of satisfactory performance, can help individuals to feel more satisfied with the outcome.

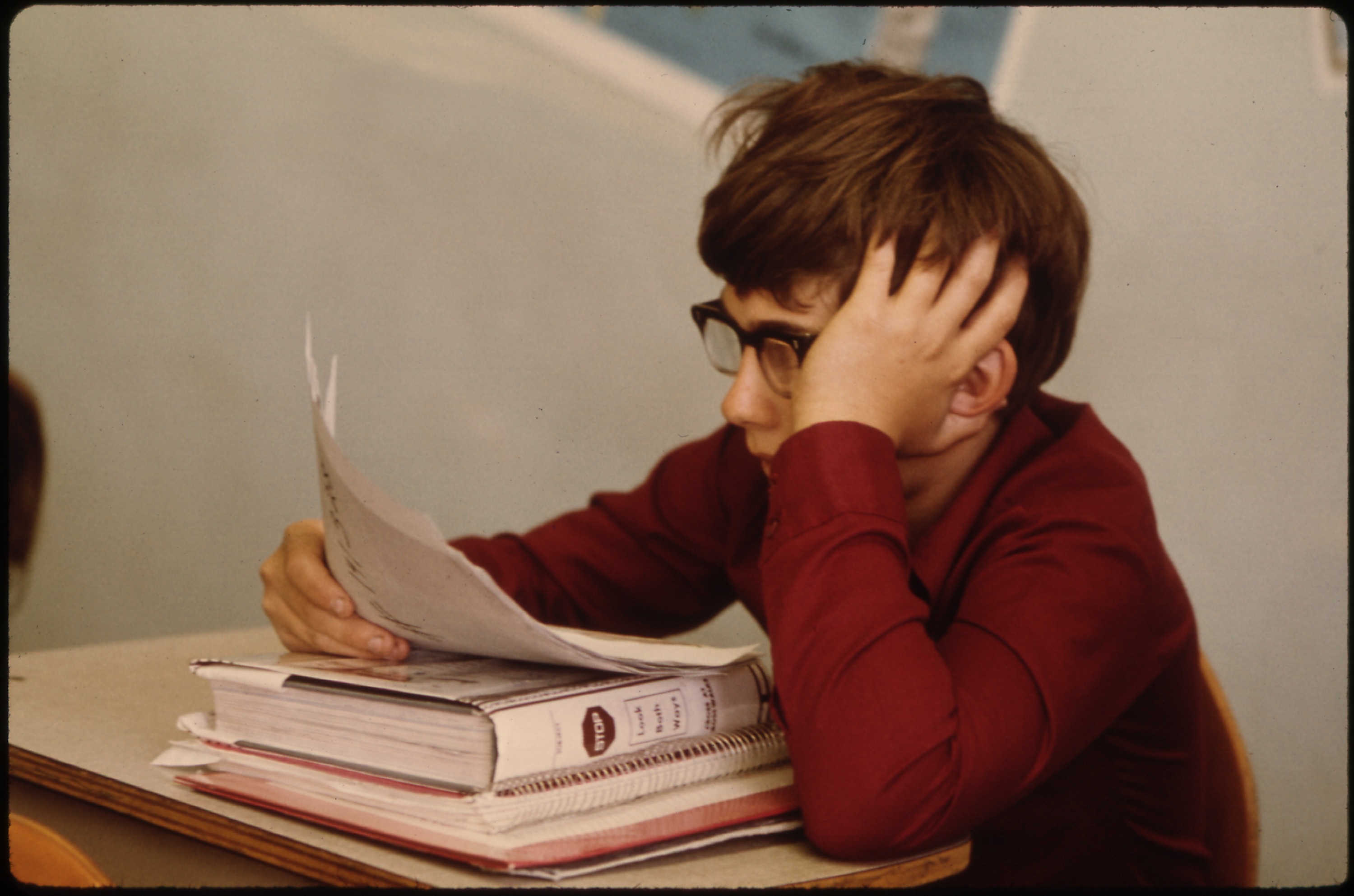
Some students use the strategy of defensive pessimism to protect their sense of self-worth by deliberately having pessimistic thoughts about the upcoming tasks.

Unlike the strategy of self-handicapping, defensive pessimism does not have a negative impact on the attainment of performance or task. Instead, the interference made on this strategy can have a negative influence on one's performance. However, while it does not have a negative impact on the attainment, defensive pessimism can provoke unhealthy consequences of “decreased life satisfaction, an eventual drop in performance level, and feelings of hopelessness and worry” as well as causing fatigue and emotional variability.

== Defensive expectation and reflectivity ==
There are two important factors of defensive pessimism which are known as strategies of defensive pessimists; defensive expectation and reflectivity.

Defensive expectation refers to individuals lowering their self-expectations towards the outcomes of the event where their ability will be evaluated, setting low standards towards which they will be judged. Other than reducing expectation towards one's performance in the task, individuals also tend to think about all the possible outcomes, either positive or negative, prior to an event or performance. This factor is referred to as reflectivity.

The strategy of defensive expectation supports the protection of one's sense of self-worth in several ways. By setting lower thus safer expectations, individuals will have less difficult achievement standards which allows an easier approach to successful performance. In similar terms, reflectivity also assists the protection of one's self-worth by thinking through all the possible outcomes in advance. Such process of defensive reflection can serve as the motivation allowing an individual to concisely plan out and try their best in order to avoid negative outcomes and scenarios. While these two strategies of defensive pessimism can be seen in a negative light in association with individual's concerns, they rather support individual's improvement and work as a motivation to stimulate the increase of effort individuals put in the preparation process of a task or performance.

== Ability, effort, and non-competitive learning structures ==
Students try to maximise their ability in various ways for the protection of their self-worth, as ability is considered as an essential factor of achievement and success which seemingly reflects an individual's worthiness. While individuals highly value their own ability from intelligence, effort from diligence is not as highly valued as ability; it is considered equally worthy as ability only in cases where the ultimate aim is an acquisition of knowledge. For the younger students who equate the value of effort and ability, their effort gives synergy effect to their sense of self-worth by supporting the promotion of ability. However, older students commonly miss the chance of receiving synergy effect as they abstain from putting in much effort due to the “threat of humiliation” which failure can yield.

To majority of the failure-avoidant students, self-worth comes from the attainment of performance and the performance depends on their ability. Since performance from one's ability leads to the sense of self-worth, in situations where students fail to show successful performance, students try to be reflected as if they are capable enough to show successful performance for the protection of one's self-esteem. The failure-avoidant students strive to look competent, utilising failure avoiding strategies such as defensive pessimism and self-handicapping, as inability is a big threat to one's sense of self-worth.

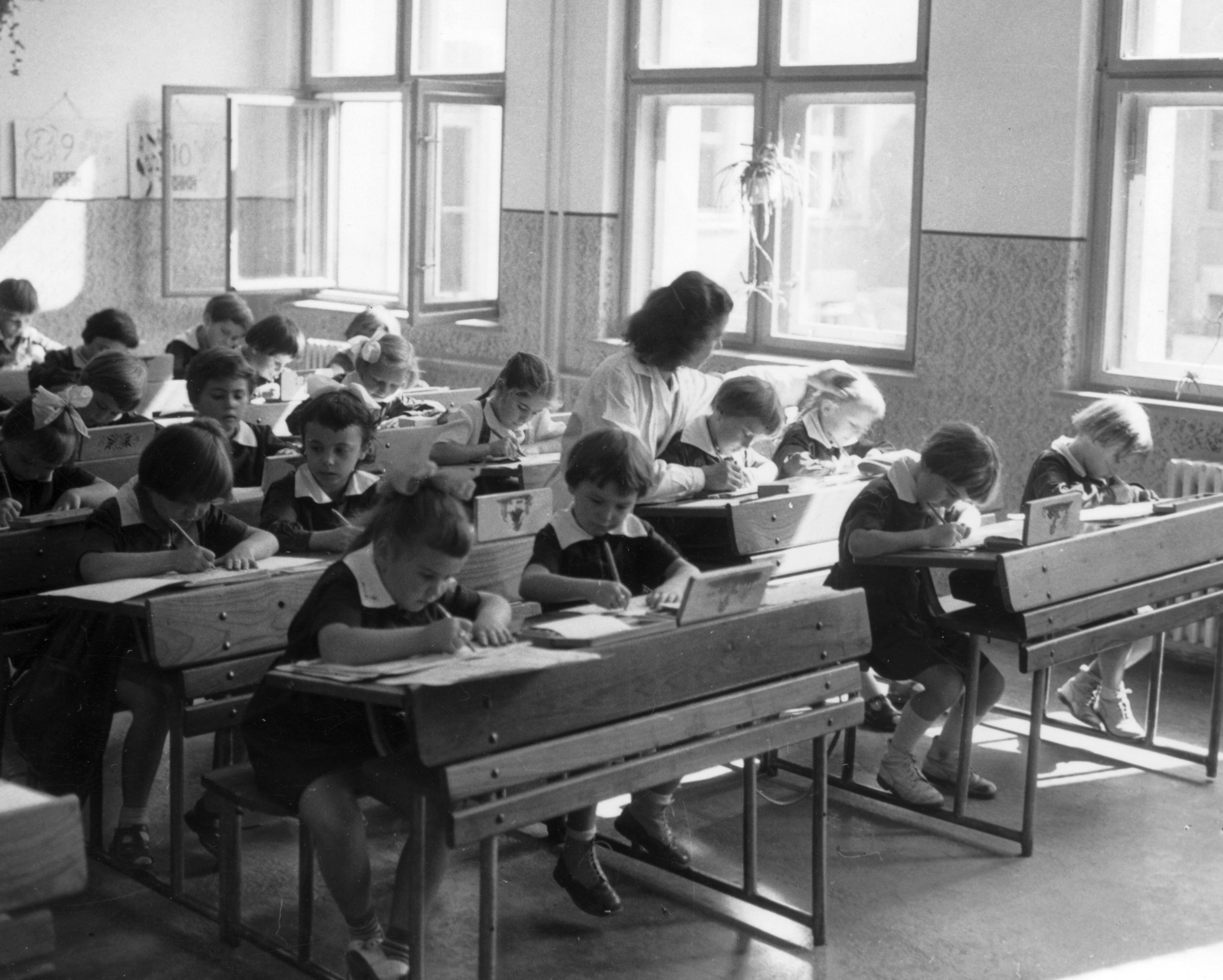
Instructing in a way that separates student's obsession of ability from willingness to learn is considered as an important role of instructors. By utilising non-competitive learning structures, instructors can stimulate students to seek for success rather than trying to avoid failure.

The different attainments of student's performance – success or failure – which come from one's ability or effort have various implications on student's self-esteem and feelings. Success resulted from one's high ability and capability leads to the sense of self-esteem and feeling of pride. Similarly, when the student attains success from putting in low effort, it brings the sense of self-esteem and feeling of pride as it represents one's high ability and capability. On the other hand, student will experience feeling of guilt by facing the failure resulting from low effort, and feelings of shame as well as humiliation if one's low ability leads to failure. Majority of students prefer experiencing the feeling of guilt coming from reduction of effort above the feeling of humiliation which can be evoked from putting in high effort and yet failing.

In order to keep students away from reduction of effort, instructing in a way that separates student's obsession of ability from willingness to learn is considered as an important role of instructors. Such ways of teaching include the utilisation of non-competitive learning structures which are known to stimulate students to seek for success rather than trying to avoid failure. For instance, “mastery learning” provides students with continuous test and study opportunities to raise their competency of subject-matter to the required level. It requires consistent effort and suggests the evaluation based on self-comparisons rather than comparison between peers.

Another well-known example of non-competitive learning structure is referred to as cooperative learning. Each members of the team are allocated with sections of total assignment and are told to master the certain section. Afterwards, each member is expected to take responsibility and teach the acquired knowledge to the other members of the team. Such method of cooperative learning aims to let students experience the reward of contributing to the benefits of others, thus leading to the conclusion that such reward can surpass the experience of excelling others.

== Quadripolar model of self-worth theory ==
The quadripolar model of self-worth theory demonstrates an individual's behaviour under the motivation to protect the sense of self-worth, with the representation of dual motives to avoid failure and approach success. This two-dimensional model proposes four broad types of learners in terms of success oriented and failure avoidant. The four types of learners consist of those who are highly success oriented and lowly avoiding failure, learners who are low in both dimensions, learners who are highly avoiding failure and lowly success oriented, and learners who are high in both dimensions.

The type of learners who are high in approaching success and low in avoiding failure are known as success oriented. This type of learners usually know the intrinsic value of studies and are not driven by the need to protect one's self-worth unlike other types of learners. The type of learners who are low in both approaching success and avoiding failure are known as failure accepters. These individuals mostly accept the implication of failure on one's ability and often reach the conclusion that one's ability is not capable enough, which can result in discontinuance of studies.

Learners who are high in avoiding failure and low in approaching success are known as failure avoiders. Rather than trying to perform well and approach success on given tasks, failure avoiders put focus on avoidance of failure in order to protect their self-perceptions of ability. They show the characteristic of staying away from any circumstances with potential failure. The ways of avoiding failure include reduction of effort, setting unrealistically low standards and goals towards the event of evaluation, and making excuses for potential poor performance. Ironically, these efforts they put in for the avoidance of failure often result in failure, but seemingly due to less threatening reasons such as lack of effort rather than inability of oneself.

Overstrivers are referred to as the type of learners who are both high in avoiding failure and approaching success. Unlike learners who are success oriented, overstrivers are particularly sensitive on the problem of failing as they have doubts about their status of ability and failure might result in confirmation of their lack of ability. For this reason, overstrivers are highly motivated by the need to avoid failure and thus to protect their self-perceptions of ability. The common characteristics of overstrivers are known as being bright and meticulous as well as hard-working.

== Developmental dynamics ==
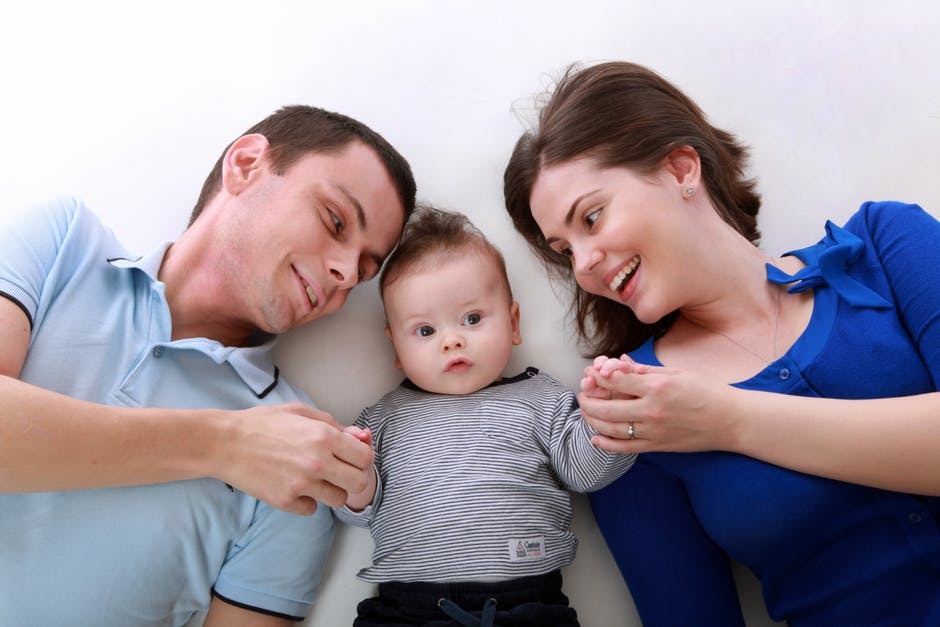
An individual's behaviour pattern shown in the situations where they are motivated to protect their sense of self-worth has been proven to have a clear relationship with child-rearing practice.

An individual's behaviour pattern shown in the situations where they are motivated to protect their sense of self-worth has been proven to have a clear relationship with child-rearing practice through the research of the drive-theory tradition. The early pioneering studies suggest that the success-oriented individuals usually have been nurtured in a warm environment where parents’ guidance takes place, receiving encouragement to make choices on their own and to practice being independent. The factors of warm nurturing environment and parents’ guidance supports the promotion of an individual's responsibility in the context of making decisions and “trying out new ideas”. Also, unlike the parents of failure-oriented students, these parents were found to disregard the poor performance of their children and reward their satisfying accomplishments instead. For instance, success-oriented college students reported the behaviours of their parents towards themselves in cases of successful performance and poor performance; they recalled that they were more often praised for successful performance and less punished for disappointing performance compared to the failure-avoiding students.

For the parents of failure-oriented students, their characteristics are commonly known to be the opposite of success-oriented students’ parents; they usually give severe punishments to their children when the children's performance did not meet their expectations. Even in cases where their children's praiseworthy performance meets their expectations, children will be met with “faint praise and even indifference”.

The studies of developmental dynamics also include ethnic factors. For instance, it has been demonstrated that Asian students usually receive more pressure of demanding family values than Anglo students. Hence they often fear academic failure which can possibly result in rejection from family, leading them to pursue success from the motivation of avoiding failure rather than being motivated from intrinsic reasons such as joy of learning.

== See also ==
- Expectancy-value theory
- Attribution theory
- Goal setting
- Self-determination theory
- Identity based motivation
- Core self-evaluations
- Self-enhancement
