= Level (cigarette) =

Swedish cigarette brand

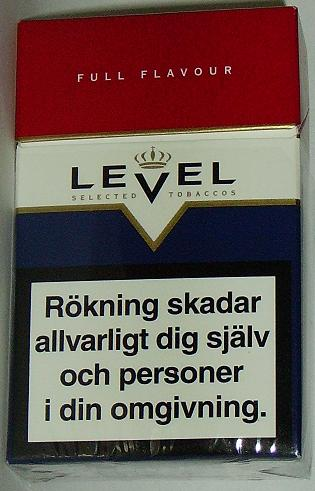
- An old Swedish pack of Level cigarettes, with a Swedish text warning at the bottom of the pack.
- Product type: Cigarette
- Current owner: JTI Sweden, a subsidiary of Japan Tobacco
- Country: Sweden
- Introduced: 2001; 25 years ago
- Markets: See Markets

Level is a Swedish brand of cigarettes, currently owned and manufactured by JTI Sweden, a subsidiary of Japan Tobacco.

== History ==
Level was launched in 2001 as a budget brand cigarette. Level was the first low priced cigarette introduced in Sweden. At introduction, a pack of Level cost 26 Swedish Krona.

Level has attracted some attention because of its slender profit margins. Of the approximately 30 Swedish Krona that a pack cost in 2005, the merchant charged about $1.65, which is about €5.00 for a normal package.

In 2015, a pack of Level cigarettes cost 50 Swedish Krona for both normal king size cigarettes and 100s cigarettes.

== Markets ==
Level is mainly sold in Sweden, but also was or still is sold in Norway, Denmark, Poland, Ukraine and Russia.

== Products ==
- Level Full Flavour
- Level Full Flavour 100's
- Level Smooth Flavour
- Level Smooth Flavour 100's
- Level Smooth Menthol
- Level Smooth Menthol 100's
- Level Menthol On Demand Full Flavour

Below are all the current brands of Level cigarettes sold, with the levels of tar, nicotine and carbon monoxide included.

Pack	Tar	Nicotine	Carbon monoxide
Level Full Flavour	10 mg	0,9 mg	10 mg
Level Full Flavour 100's	10 mg	0,8 mg	10 mg
Level Smooth Flavour	8 mg	0,7 mg	9 mg
Level Smooth Flavour 100s	8 mg	0,7 mg	9 mg
Level Smooth Menthol	8 mg	0,7 mg	9 mg
Level Smooth Menthol 100's	8 mg	0,7 mg	9 mg
Level Menthol On Demand Full Flavour	10 mg	0,7 mg	10 mg

== See also ==
- Cigarette
- Tobacco smoking
