= Relative deprivation =

Measure of poverty and social exclusion

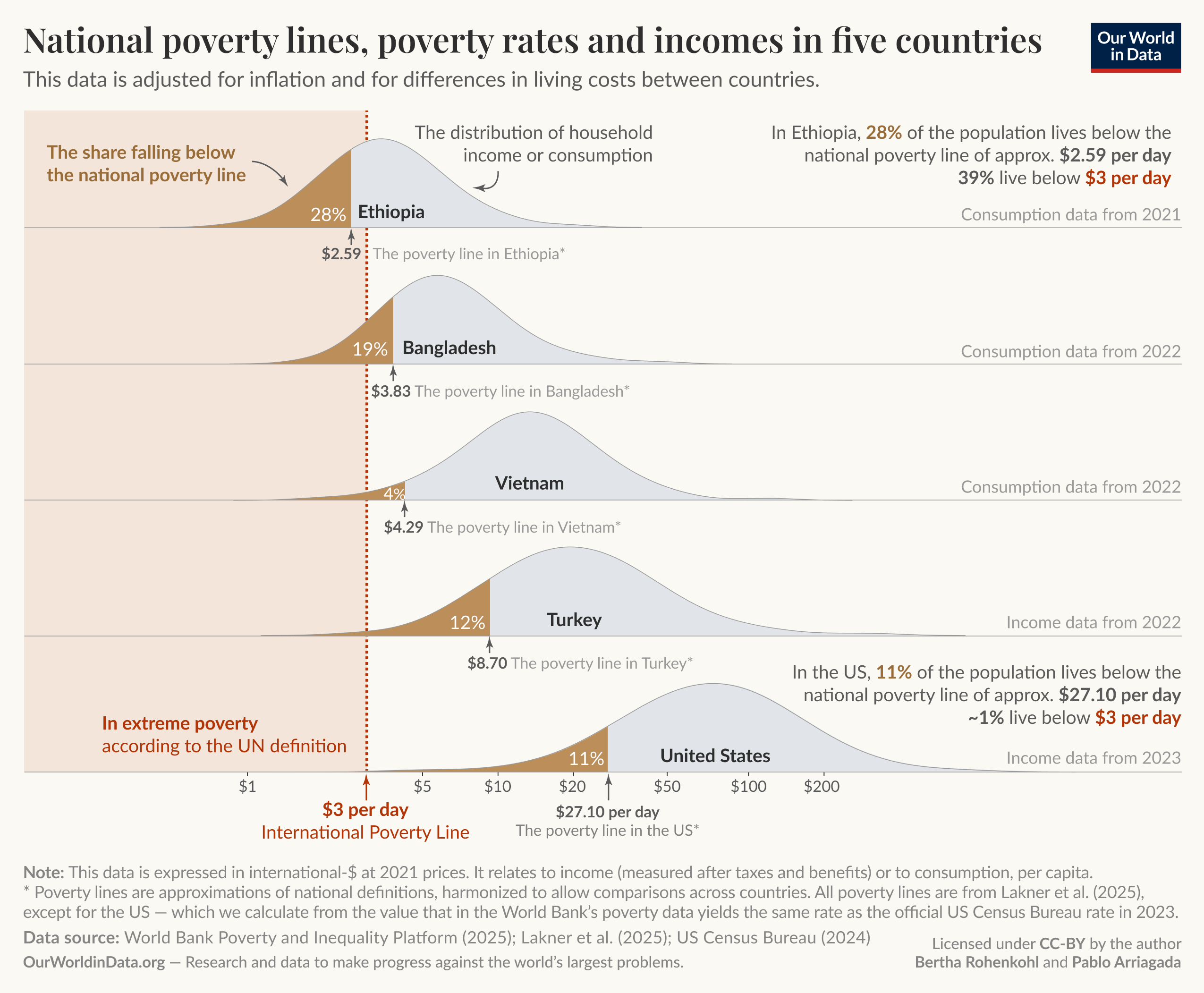
National poverty lines vary widely between countries.

Relative deprivation is the lack of resources to sustain the diet, lifestyle, activities and amenities that an individual or group are accustomed to or that are widely encouraged or approved in the society to which they belong. Measuring relative deprivation allows an objective comparison between the situation of the individual or group compared to the rest of society. Relative deprivation may also emphasise the individual experience of discontent when being deprived of something to which one believes oneself to be entitled, however emphasizing the perspective of the individual makes objective measurement problematic.

It is a term used in social sciences to describe feelings or measures of economic, political, or social deprivation that are relative rather than absolute. The term is inextricably linked to the similar terms poverty and social exclusion. The concept of relative deprivation has important consequences for both behaviour and attitudes, including feelings of stress, political attitudes, and participation in collective action. It is relevant to researchers studying multiple fields in social sciences. The concept was first used systematically by the authors of The American Soldier who studied army units and found out that it is the perceived discrepancy between anticipation and attainment which results in feelings of relative deprivation.

Social scientists, particularly political scientists and sociologists, have cited relative deprivation, especially temporal relative deprivation, as a potential cause of social movements and deviance, leading in extreme situations to political violence such as rioting, terrorism, civil wars and other instances of social deviance such as crime. For example, some scholars of social movements explain their rise by citing grievances of people who feel deprived of what they perceive as values to which they are entitled. Similarly, individuals engage in deviant behaviours when their means do not match their goals.

In response to exploration of the concept of relative deprivation, the term "relative gratification" has emerged in social psychology to discuss the opposite phenomenon.

According to a June 2015 report by the IMF, the defining challenge of our time is widening income inequality. In advanced economies, the gap between the rich and poor is at its highest level in decades. Inequality trends have been more mixed in emerging markets and developing countries (EMDCs), with some countries experiencing declining inequality, but pervasive inequities in access to education, health care, and finance remain.

== Theory ==
In one of the first formal definitions of the concept, Walter Runciman noted that there are four preconditions of relative deprivation (of object X by person A):

- Person A does not have X
- Person A knows of other persons that have X
- Person A wants to have X
- Person A believes obtaining X is realistic

Runciman distinguished between egoistic and fraternalistic relative deprivation. The former is caused by unfavorable social position when compared to other, better off members of a specific group (of which A is the member) and the latter, by unfavorable comparison to other, better off groups. Egoistic relative deprivation can be seen in the example of a worker who believes he should have been promoted faster and may lead that person to take actions intended to improve his position within the group; those actions are, however, unlikely to affect many people. Fraternalism can be seen in the example of racial discrimination and are much more likely to result in the creation and growth of large social movement, like the American Civil Rights Movement in the 1960s. Another example of fraternalistic relative deprivation is the envy that teenagers feel towards the wealthy characters who are portrayed in movies and on television as being "middle class" or "normal" despite wearing expensive clothes, driving expensive cars, and living in mansions. Fraternalistic group deprivation has also been linked to voting behaviours, particularly in the case of voting for the far-right.

== Relativeness ==
Feelings of deprivation are relative, as they come from a comparison to social norms that are not absolute and usually differ from time and place. This differentiates relative deprivation from objective deprivation (also known as absolute deprivation or absolute poverty) - a condition that applies to all underprivileged people. This leads to an important conclusion: while the objective deprivation (poverty) in the world may change over time, relative deprivation will not, as long as social inequality persists and some humans are better off than others.

Consider the following examples: in 1905 cars were a luxury, hence an individual unable to afford one would not feel or be viewed as deprived. In 2010, when cars are common in most societies, an individual unable to afford one is much more likely to feel deprived. In another example, mobile phones are common today, and many people may feel that they deserve to have one. Fifty years ago, when there were no mobile phones, such a sentiment would not exist.

Relative deprivation may be temporal; that is, it can be experienced by people that experience expansion of rights or wealth, followed by stagnation or reversal of those gains. Such phenomena are also known as unfulfilled rising expectations.

In an example from the realm, the lack of the right to vote is more likely to be felt as a deprivation by people who had it once than by the people who never had the opportunity to vote.

== Relative and absolute deprivation ==
Some scientists, for instance John Kenneth Galbraith, have argued that relative differences in economic wealth are more important than absolute deprivation, and that it is more significant in determining human quality of life. This debate has important consequences for social policy, particularly on whether poverty can be eliminated simply by raising total wealth or whether egalitarian measures are also needed.

A specific form of relative deprivation is relative poverty. A measure of relative poverty defines poverty as being below some relative poverty line, such as households who earn less than 20% of the median income.

== Critique ==
Critique of this theory has pointed out that this theory fails to explain why some people who feel discontent fail to take action and join social movements. Counter-arguments include that some people are prone to conflict-avoidance, are short-term-oriented, and that imminent life difficulties may arise since there is no guarantee that life-improvement will result from social action.

== See also ==
- Deprivation index – Measure of poverty of small areas
- Frog pond effect – Psychological effect
- Group conflict – Hostilities between different groups
- Identity performance – How persons present themselves in social interactions
- Envy – Pain at the sight of another's good fortune
- Keeping up with the Joneses – Idiom on comparing oneself to neighbors
- Multidimensional Poverty Index – Range of poverty indicators
- Objective deprivation – Minimum income deemed adequate to live in a specific country or place
- Positional good – Goods whose value is given by desirability rather than quantity
- Rat race – Metaphor for career pursuits and attainment
- Status symbol – Object that denotes one's social position
- Social comparison theory – Theory in social psychology
- Social status – Position within social structure
- Social stress – Type of psychological stress
- Subjective theory of value – Economic theory proposed by Austrian scholar Carl Menger
- Tocqueville effect – Social phenomenon
