= Decorative concrete =

Concrete as an aesthetic enhancement

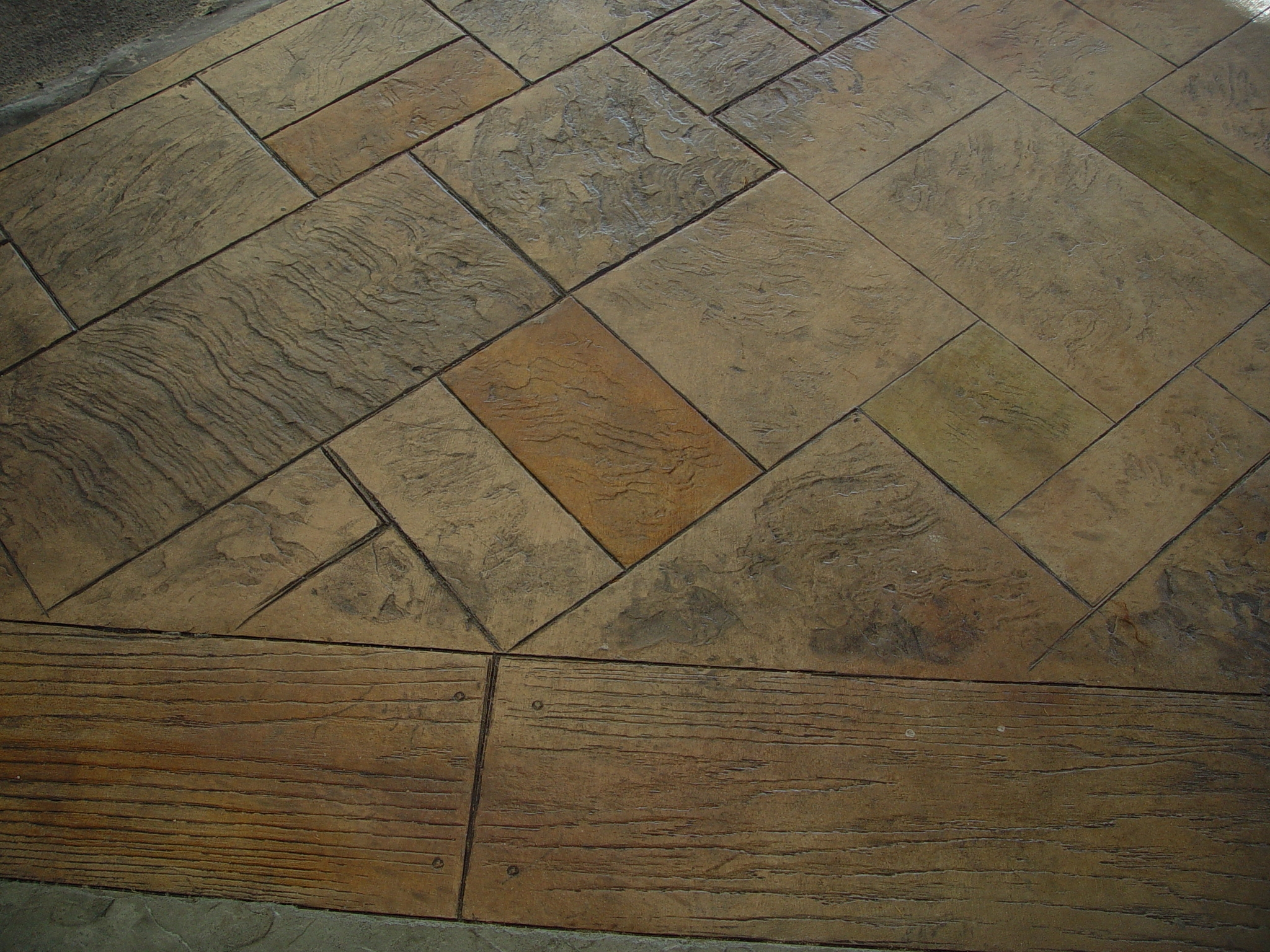
Stamped concrete in various patterns, highlighted with acid stain

Decorative concrete is the use of concrete as not simply a utilitarian medium for construction but as an aesthetic enhancement to a structure, while still serving its function as an integral part of the building itself such as floors, walls, driveways, and patios.

The transformation of concrete into decorative concrete is achieved through the use of a variety of materials that may be applied during the pouring process or after the concrete is cured, these materials and/or systems include but are not limited to stamped concrete, acid staining, decorative overlays, polished concrete, concrete countertops, vertical overlays and more.

== Concrete statues ==
Concrete statues are made by pouring concrete into a latex mold. Often painted and sold for garden ornaments. Most popular designs are bird baths and garden gnomes.

== Stamped concrete ==
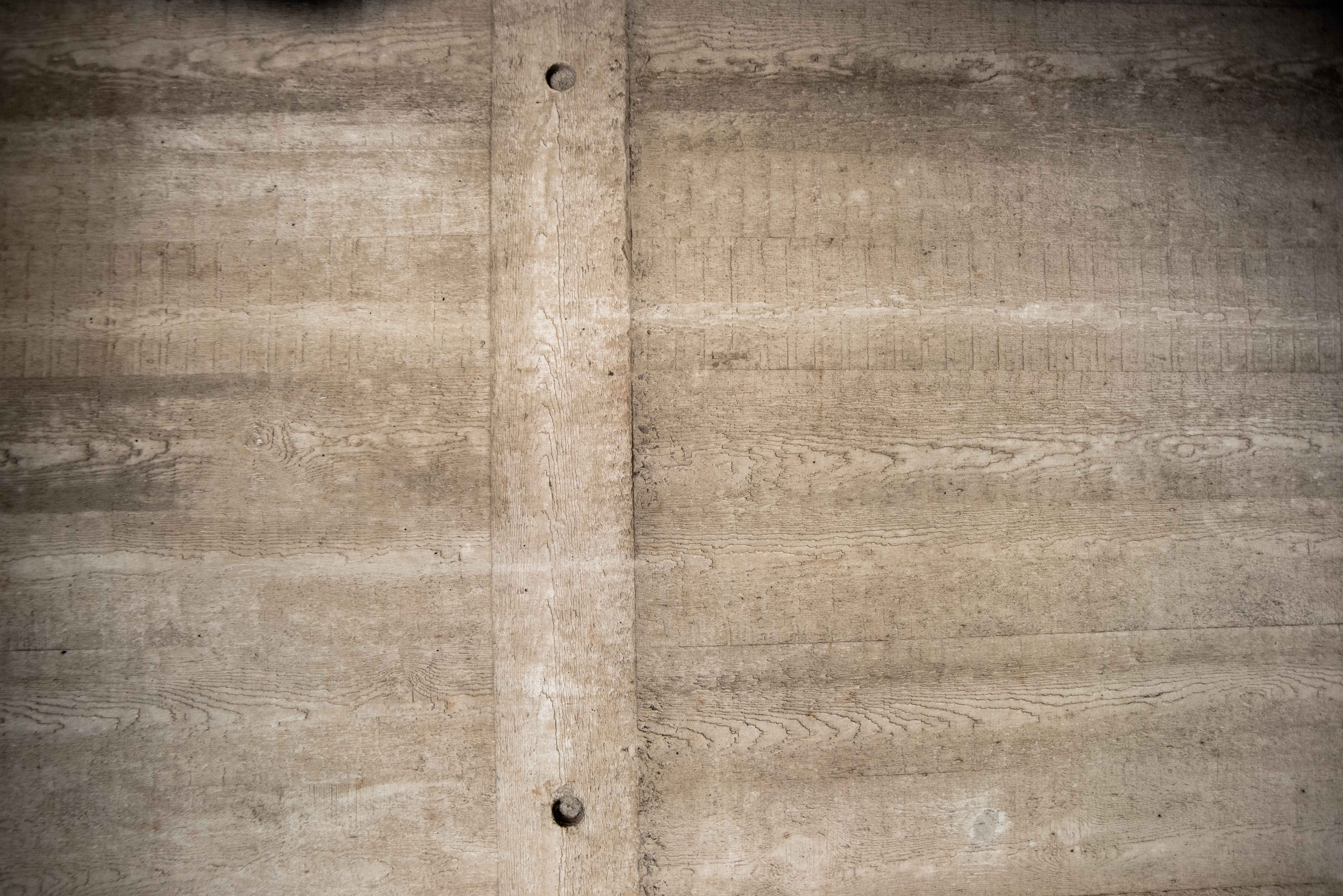
Board-marked concrete showing the grain of the timber

As a modern technique, stamped concrete is the process of adding texture and color to concrete to make it resemble stone, brick, slate, cobblestone and many other products found in nature including wood, fossils, shells and many more. This limitless array of possibilities combined with great durability and lower cost than natural products makes Stamped Concrete an easy choice for new construction and renovation projects.

The installation consists of pressing molds into the concrete while the concrete is still in its plastic state. Color is achieved by using dry shakes, color hardeners, powder or liquid releases, integral colors, or acid stains. All these products may be combined to create even more intricate designs.

Stamped concrete may be used on driveways, patios, commercial roads and parking lots and even interior floors. Stamped concrete is a desirable finish to concrete areas, however with time and wear the color dyes fade and the surface looks patchy and unpresentable. There are many re-coloring options which can completely restore and rejuvenate the color and presentation of faded stamped concrete.

== Exposed aggregate concrete ==
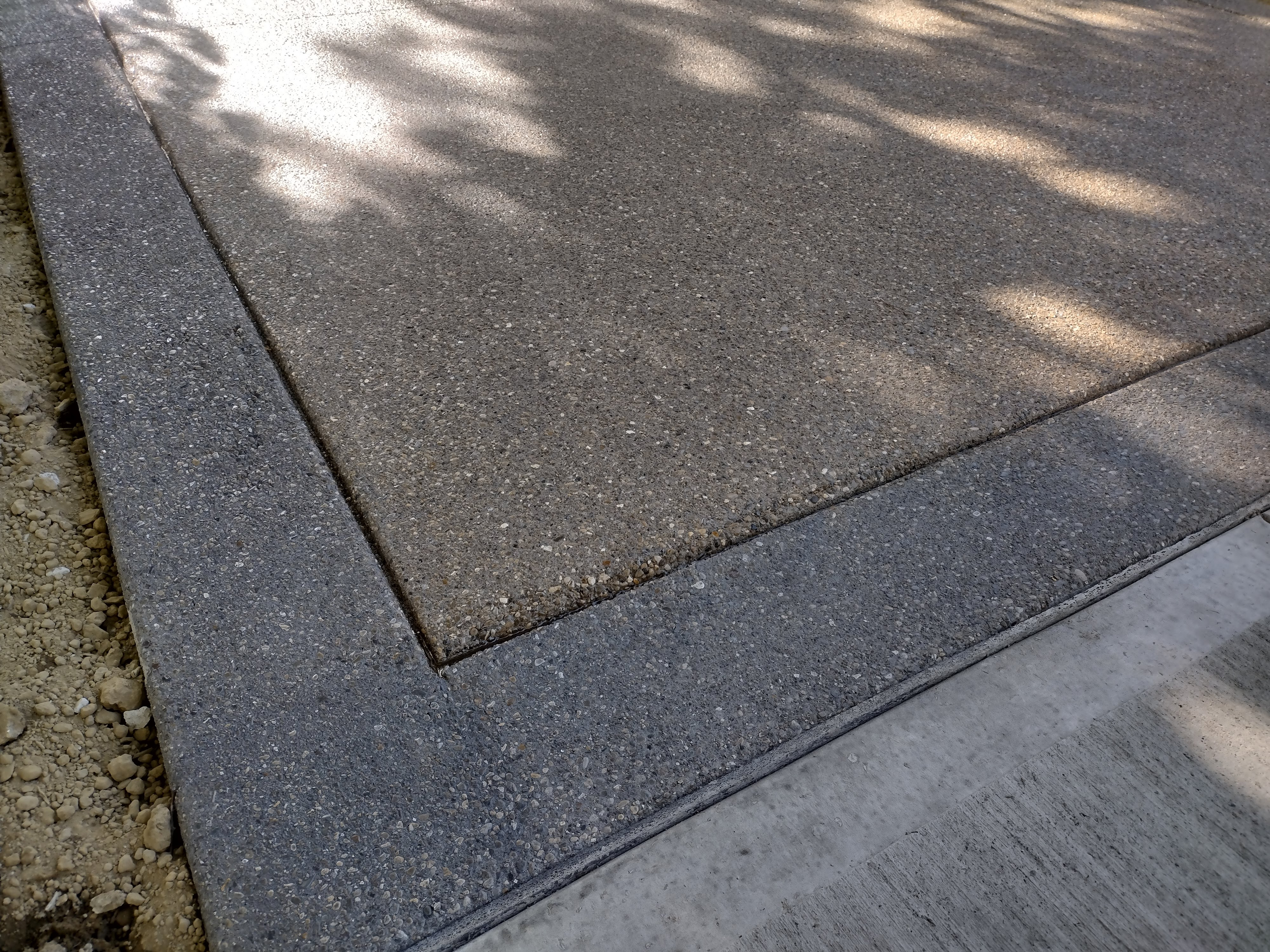
A brown Exposed Aggregate concrete driveway with a gray Exposed Aggregate border.

Exposed aggregate concrete is a popular decorative concrete option known for its decorative gravel appearance. During the concrete pouring process, the top layer of cement/sand paste is removed to reveal the embedded aggregate (stones, pebbles, or even shells). This creates a visually appealing surface with a variety of colors, shapes, and sizes. Additionally, colored concrete and/or a semi-transparent, colored sealant can be added or applied to the concrete to enhance and/or protect the surface from stains and weathering. Exposed Aggregate concrete is normally one of the cheapest forms of decorative concrete and the amount of aggregate reveal can vary from a sandy look, to bigger gravel stone. Exposed aggregate concrete is highly durable and resistant to heavy traffic, making it ideal for driveways, sidewalks, patios, and pool decks. It provides excellent traction, making it a safe choice for outdoor areas. With its decorative appeal and durability, exposed aggregate concrete adds a touch of elegance and can be a great replacement for decorative gravel.

== Concrete dyes ==
Concrete dyes take many different forms and compositions and can be used on both residential and commercial concrete applications, including sound/retaining walls, bridges, countertops, floors, etc.

Early concrete dyes consisted of generic printing inks that were dissolved in mild solutions of alcohol and applied to concrete surfaces to add a wide array of color to plain gray concrete. When alcohol-based dyes are exposed to sunlight, the color either lightens or fades out completely. Therefore, alcohol-based dyes were more prevalent in interior applications where direct sunlight or other forms of ultraviolet (UV) lighting was not present.

Manufacturers later began dissolving the same printing inks in different carriers, such as acetone, lacquer thinner and other solvents, hoping to achieve increased penetration levels. In addition, UV inhibiting agents were added to new dyes to help with the UV instability issues. However, slight fading (5-8% per year) still occurs when the dye is exposed to direct sunlight.

Colored concrete can be obtained from many ready mix concrete companies and many have color charts available.

== Acid staining ==
Acid staining is not a dyeing or pigment-base coloring systems, but a chemical reaction. A mixture of water, mineral salts and a slight amount of muriatic acid is applied to the concrete surface. This chemical reaction with the existing minerals (primarily lime) in the concrete over a period of one to four hours creates new earth tone colors on the concrete surface. The concrete surface is later scrubbed to remove excess stain and neutralized by a basic solution of ammonia and water or baking soda (less likely to cause whiting later) to help raise the ph level back to normal level. Due to inconsistencies in the surface level of concrete floor, acid staining creates a variegated or mottled appearance that is unique to each slab. The color penetration ranges from 1/16 to 1/32 of an inch. Older exterior concrete surfaces may not color as well as interior surfaces because the environment has leached or percolated out the mineral content. As well, any exposed aggregate (rocks) in worn concrete will not accept staining.

Chemicals commonly used in acid staining include hydrochloric acid, iron chloride, and sodium bicarbonate.

== Water based staining ==
Water based stains are similar to acid based stains in the sense that one can still achieve a translucent look like acid; some stains are able to achieve an opaque color and/or a translucent effect. The main difference is that acid stains react to the concrete and change the physical make up of the concrete material, whereas water based stains are more of a "coating" that bonds with the concrete. There are many variations of water based stains that have come into the decorative concrete industry that perform in a number of different ways. Some are polymer based, acrylic and epoxy.

== Overlaying ==
Concrete overlays date to the 1960s when chemical engineers from some of the larger, well known chemical companies began to experiment with acrylic paint resins as modifiers for cement and sand mixes. The result was a thin cementitious topping material that would adhere to concrete surfaces and provide a newly resurfaced coating to restore the worn surface. Concrete overlays lacked the long-term performance characteristics of acrylic resins. Acrylic resins provided good UV resistance, but lacked long term water resistance and adhesion characteristics needed to provide a long term and permanent solution.

=== Polymer cement overlays ===
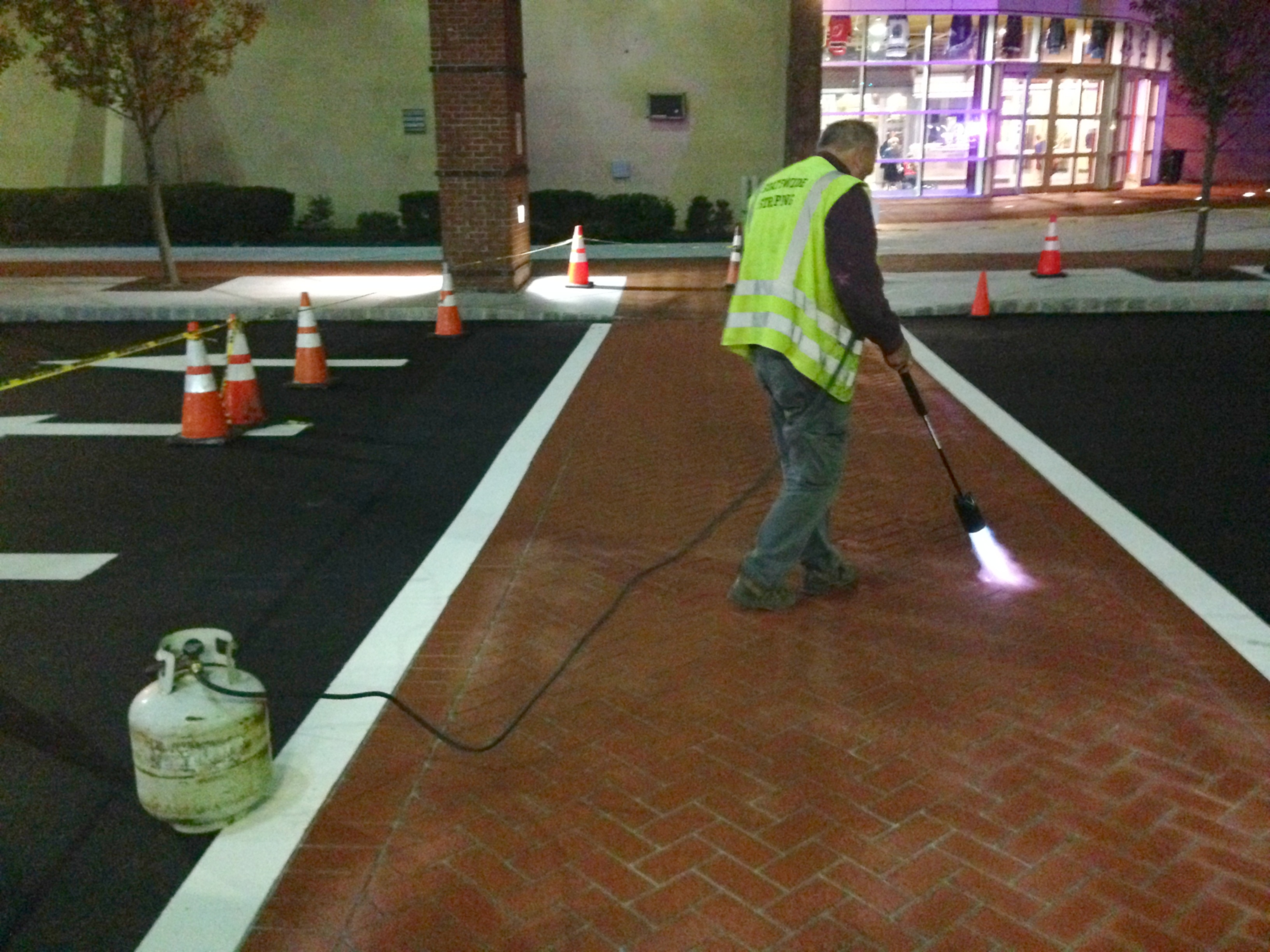
Construction of a polymer cement overlay to change asphalt pavement to brick texture and color to create decorative crosswalk and traffic calming in high-pedestrian area.

Polymer cement overlays, consisting of a proprietary blend of Portland cements, various aggregates and polymer resins, were introduced over 20 years ago. The purpose of adding a polymer resin to the cement and aggregate is to greatly increase the performance characteristics and versatility of conventional cements, mortars and concrete materials. Unlike conventional cement and concrete mixes, polymer cement overlays can be applied thinly or thickly without fear of delamination or typical product failure. In addition, polymer cement overlays are much more resistant to damage from salt, petrochemicals, UV, harsh weather conditions and traffic wearing.

Originally intended for use as a thin surface restoration material for concrete substrates, polymer cement overlays were introduced into the architectural concrete and commercial flooring industries in the early 80s. Subsequently, its use in these industries has become standard. Polymer cement overlays are regarded as economical in providing long term, durable renovation without the need for costly and continuous repairs associated with deteriorating concrete surfaces.

Polymer cement overlays are used for interior and exterior applications ranging from:

- Skim coat/broom finish concrete resurfacing – Restore and protect damaged, pitted, flaking and stained concrete back to the look of a new concrete surface.
- Concrete regrading & leveling – Repair and level concrete surfaces that have settled.
- Existing substrate redecorating and renovating – Alter the appearance of existing concrete or wood substrates through applying "thin stamped" or "thin stained" overlays, creating new textures, colors and designs. For use on commercial or resident pool deck, this frequently takes the form of "splatter textures" or "knockdowns," in which polymer cement is applied to the existing concrete substrate in a moderately textured finish (average of 1/8” thickness) in various patterns. Often, the texture is knocked down with a trowel to slightly modify the appearance and feel of the finished application.

=== Stamped overlays ===
Rubber imprinting tools (stamps) are impressed into thin pre-mixed concrete overlay material shortly after it is placed to create natural stone or brick textures. These rubber imprinting tools are manufactured from molds created from authentic stone or wood. Release agents are used to help release the stamps from the concrete without sticking. Release agents come in either a liquid or powder form and are available in a wide range of colors.

== Epoxy coating ==
Applied over acid stained, dyes and/or overlays to seal and protect. Some epoxies are also colored.

== Polishing ==
Concrete can be polished with Mechanical grinders and diamond pads of increasing grit sizes. Diamond pads come in many grit or mesh sizes. Common sizes start with 6 grit and can go up to 8500 grit although concrete can only maintain a shine of about 800 grit, it can be helped by adding a concrete hardener such as sodium silicate or lithium silicate which will allow concrete to hold an 1800 through 3000 grit shine. The work is accomplished in multiple stages by passing over the concrete with successive grit diamond pads until it has a hard-glassy finish. Both acid stains and concrete dyes can be used during the polishing process.

== Engraving ==
Existing concrete can be remodeled by cutting lines and grooves into its surface. Intricate designs such as logos or text can be engraved using a portable CNC concrete engraving system.

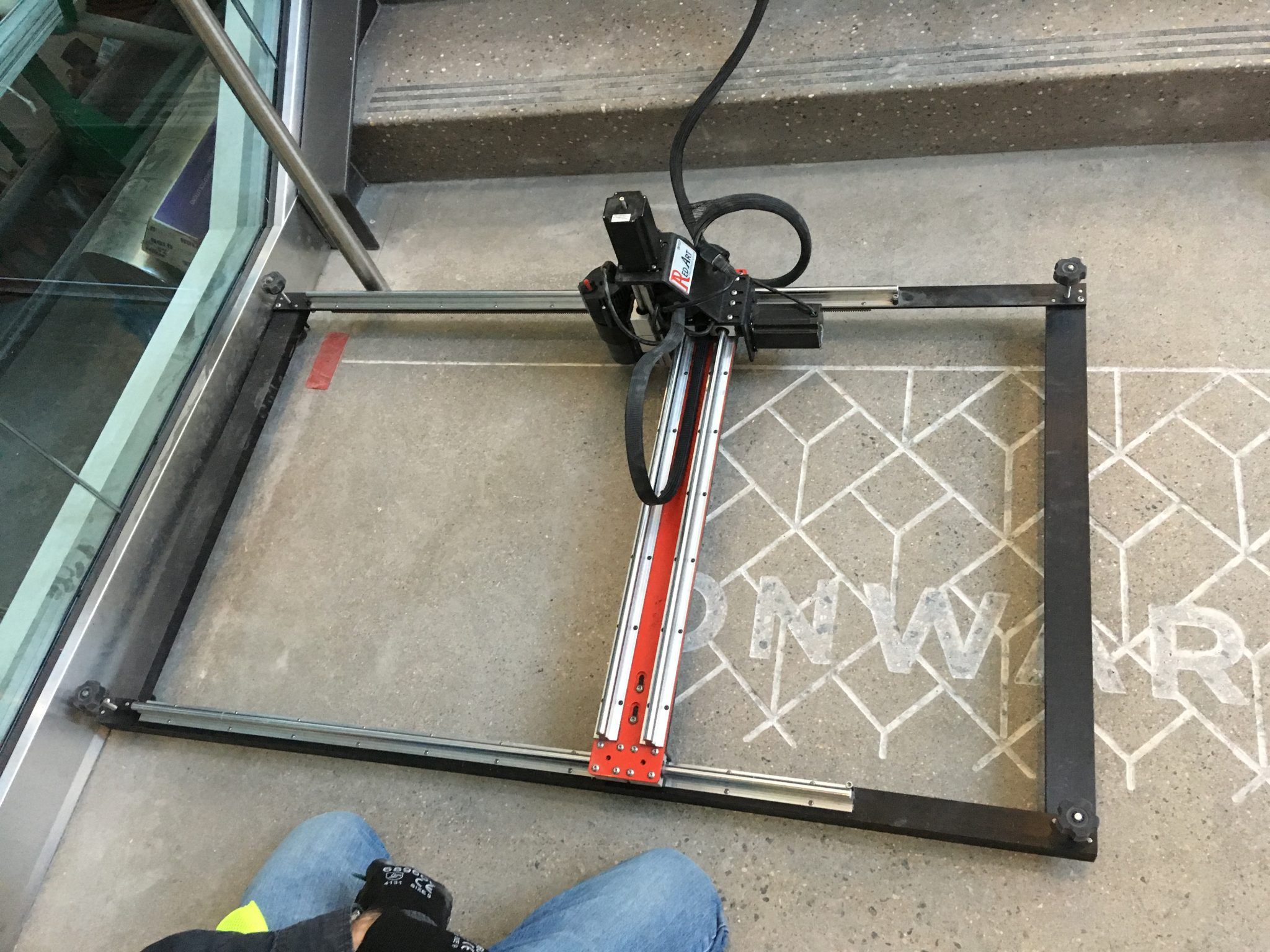
Concrete can also be remodeled by a CNC driven router system.

Geometric patterns, straight or curved lines and custom designs can be cut directly into the surface of the concrete creating the look of tile, flagstone, cobblestone and many other common surface patterns. This is usually achieved using tools like an angle grinder fitted with diamond blades, but is more effectively accomplished using specialty tools designed specifically for cutting designs into the concrete.

== Form liner ==
Concrete can also be cast into unique and detailed designs using urethane form liner. These projects can be seen around the United States and the world, usually on sound/retaining walls, building exteriors, and bridges.

Generally, this process starts with the sculptor, who creates the design to be used in the concrete using clay, polyurethane or wax. When the original art is complete, a cast is made using synthetic liquid rubber, and from this cast, form liners are produced in the reverse image of the original.

The form liner then acts as a mold for the concrete to be formed against. Once the concrete is set, the form liner is stripped from the hardened concrete surface. The concrete is permanently textured with the pattern of the form liner.
