= List of polyurethane applications =

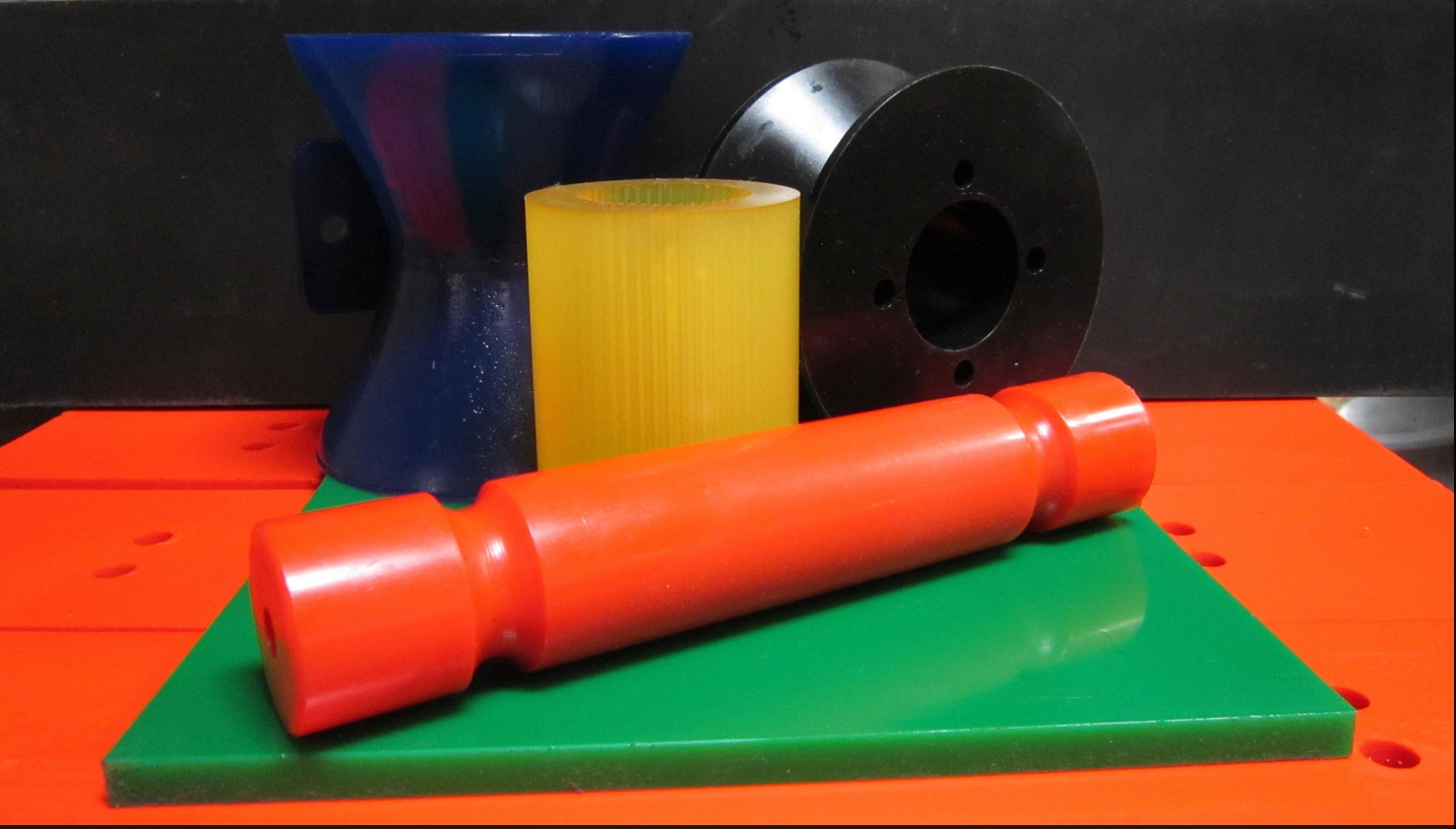
Custom-cast polyurethane objects

Polyurethane products have many uses. Over three quarters of the global consumption of polyurethane products is in the form of foams, with flexible and rigid types being roughly equal in market size. In both cases, the foam is usually behind other materials: flexible foams are behind upholstery fabrics in commercial and domestic furniture; rigid foams are between metal, or plastic walls/sheets of most refrigerators and freezers, or other surface materials in the case of thermal insulation panels in the construction sector. Its use in garments is growing: for example, in lining the cups of brassieres. Polyurethane is also used for moldings which include door frames, columns, balusters, window headers, pediments, medallions and rosettes.

Polyurethane formulations cover an extremely wide range of stiffness, hardness, and densities. These materials include:

- Low-density flexible foam used in upholstery, bedding, automotive and truck seating, and novel inorganic plant substrates for roof or wall gardens
- Low density elastomers used in footwear
- Hard solid plastics used as electronic instrument bezels and structural parts
- Flexible plastics used as straps and bands
- Cast and injection molded components for various markets – i.e., agriculture, military, automotive, industrial, etc.

Polyurethane foam is widely used in high resiliency flexible foam seating, rigid foam insulation panels, microcellular foam seals and gaskets, durable elastomeric wheels and tires, automotive suspension bushings, electrical potting compounds, seals, gaskets, carpet underlay, and hard plastic parts (such as for electronic instruments).

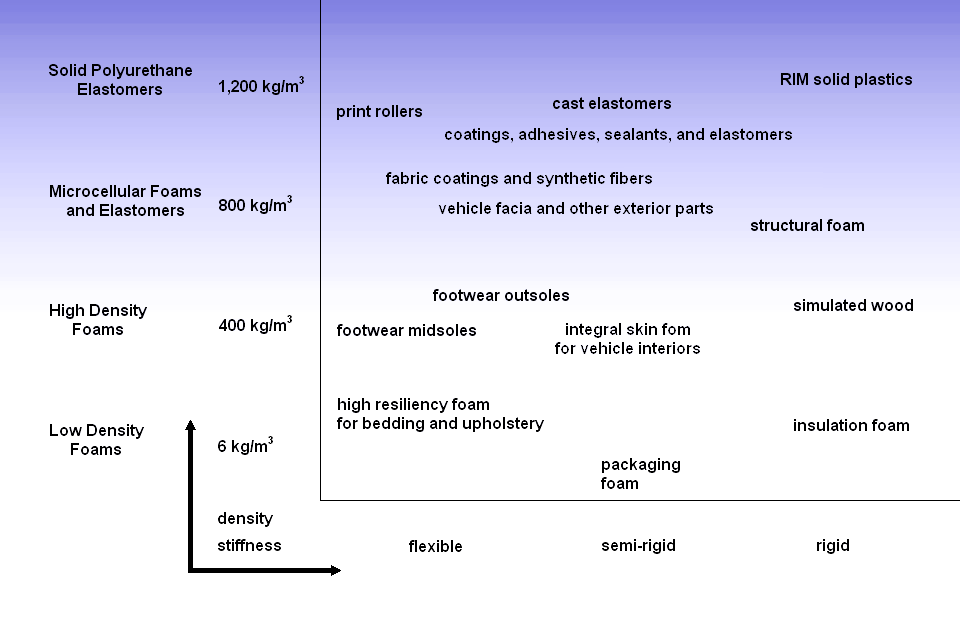
Applications of polyurethane materials, plotted by density and stiffness.

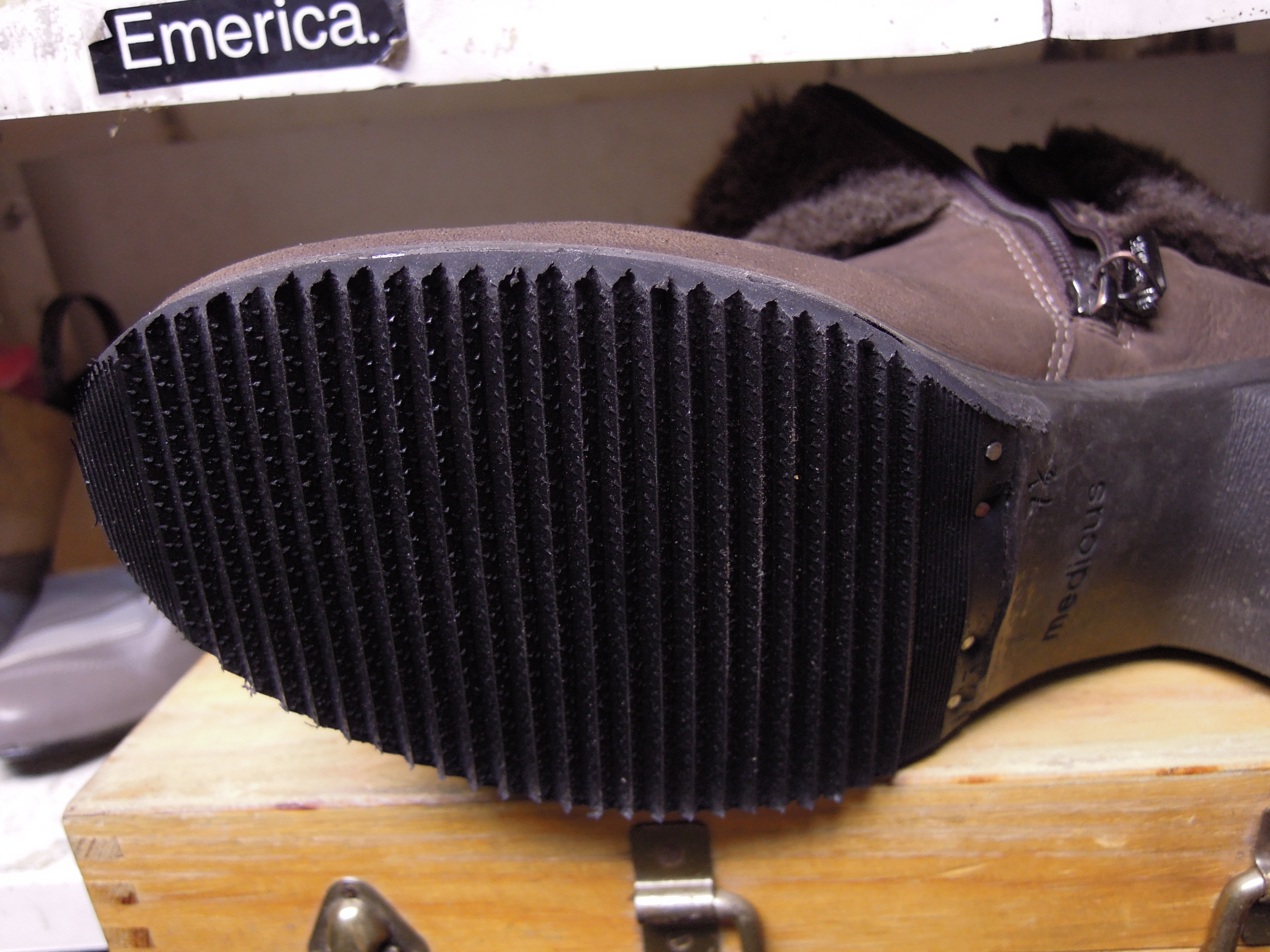
This repaired shoe is probably, like many shoes, soled with polyurethane. PU soles may crumble due to hydrolysis.

== Usage per application ==
The following table shows an example how polyurethanes were used in one country over a dozen years ago (US data from 2004):

Application	Usage (millions of pounds)	Proportion of total
Building & construction	1,459	26.8%
Transportation	1,298	23.9%
Furniture & bedding	1,127	20.6%
Appliances	278	5.1%
Packaging	251	4.6%
Textiles, fibers & apparel	181	3.3%
Machinery & foundry	178	3.3%
Electronics	75	1.4%
Footwear	39	0.7%
Other uses	558	10.2%
Total	5,444	100.0%

== Cleaning products ==
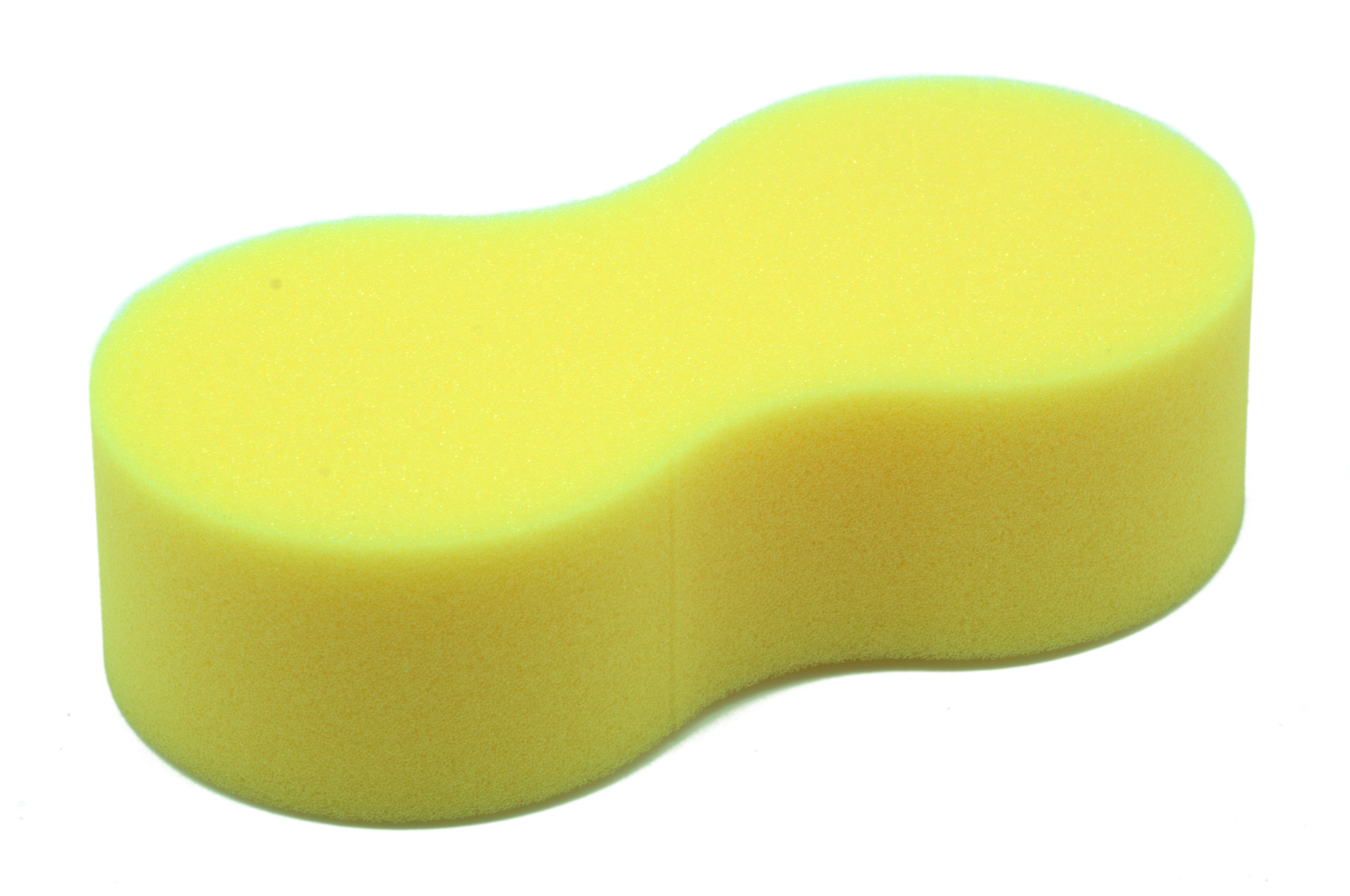
Polyurethane foam sponge

Open-cell flexible polyurethane foam is used to make many kitchen and bathroom sponges. The combination of low cost, high flexibility and high abrasion and tear resistance make polyurethanes excellent materials for scrubbing applications. Polyurethane sponges have been shown to reduce the risk of spreading certain bacteria.

== Industrial Insulation ==
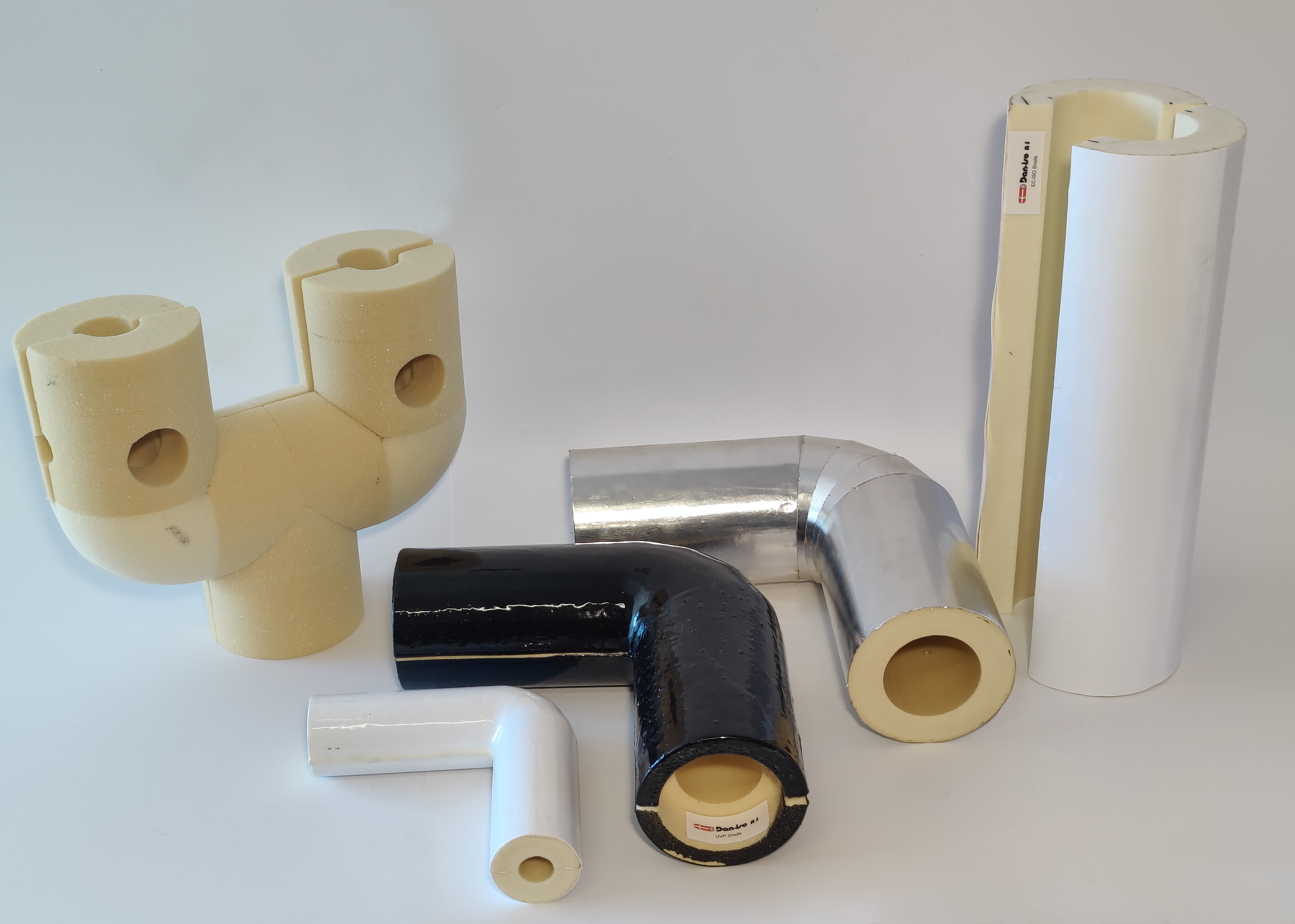
Industrial Insulation

Rigid polyurethane foam is used in various industries to provide thermal insulation to installations and pipes. In particular, the piping for district heating systems in Europe is primarily insulated using a pre-insulated pipes sandwich assembly composed of a steel heat service pipe, an insulating layer (polyurethane foam) and a polyethylene (PE) casing, which are bonded by the insulating material. One of the main advantages of rigid polyurethane foam is that it offers a very low thermal conductivity (with values as low as 23mW/m⋅K) while offering enough structural strength to withstand the loads that buried pipe systems are subjected to.

Due to the closed-cell nature of rigid polyurethane foams, PUR insulation has minimal water absorption, which coupled with an appropriate cover, makes it a particularly suitable in applications where bacterial growth is a concern. Polyurethane insulation is suitable for insulating pipes with surface temperatures ranging from -196°C to 148°C.

== Furniture ==
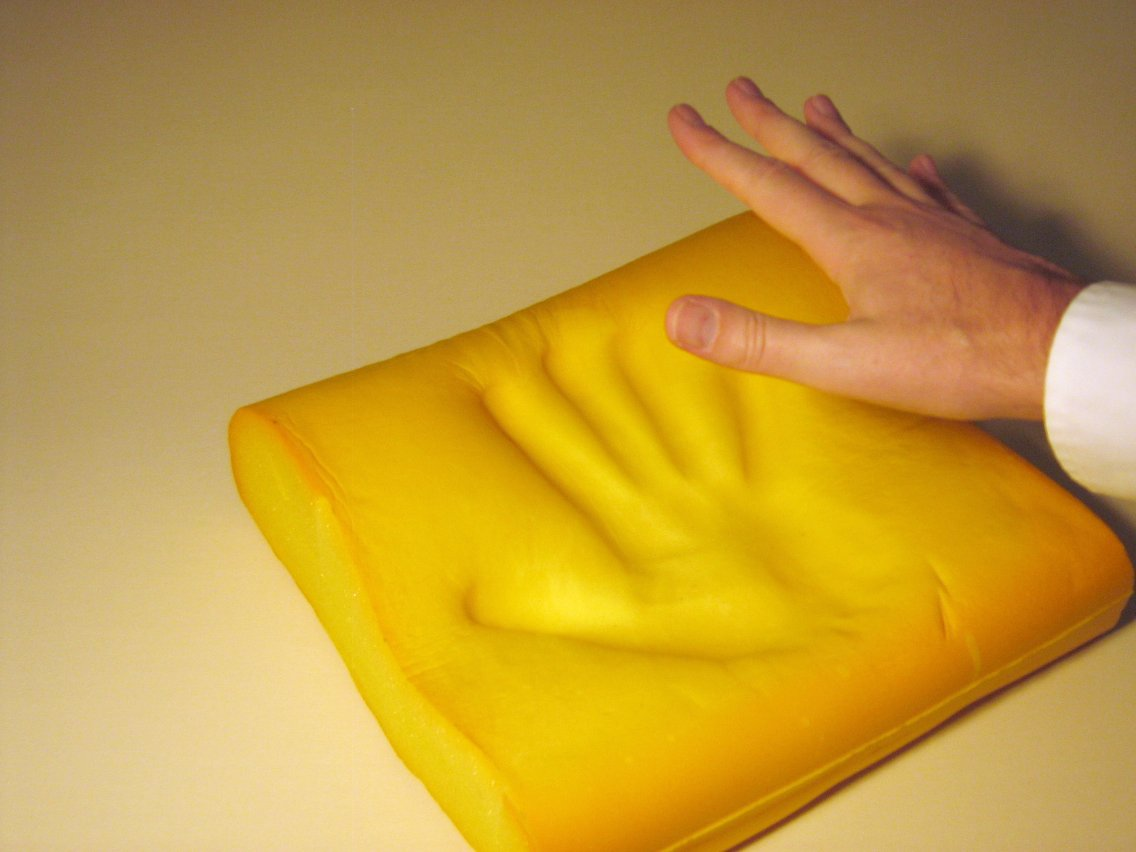
Memory foam cushions like these are made of viscoelastic polyurethane foam. Note yellowing caused by light exposure.

Open cell flexible polyurethane foam (FPF) is made by mixing polyols, diisocyanates, catalysts, auxiliary blowing agents and other additives and allowing the resulting foam to rise freely. Most FPF is manufactured using continuous processing technology and also can be produced in batches where relatively small blocks of foam are made in open-topped molds, boxes, or other suitable enclosurers. The foam is then cut to the desired shape and size for use in a variety of furniture and furnishings applications.

Applications for flexible polyurethane foam include upholstered furniture cushions, automotive seat cushions and interior trim, carpet cushion, and mattress padding and solid-core mattress cores.

Flexible polyurethane foam is a recyclable product.

== Automobile seats ==
Flexible and semi-flexible polyurethane foams are used extensively for interior components of automobiles, in seats, headrests, armrests, roof liners, dashboards and instrument panels.

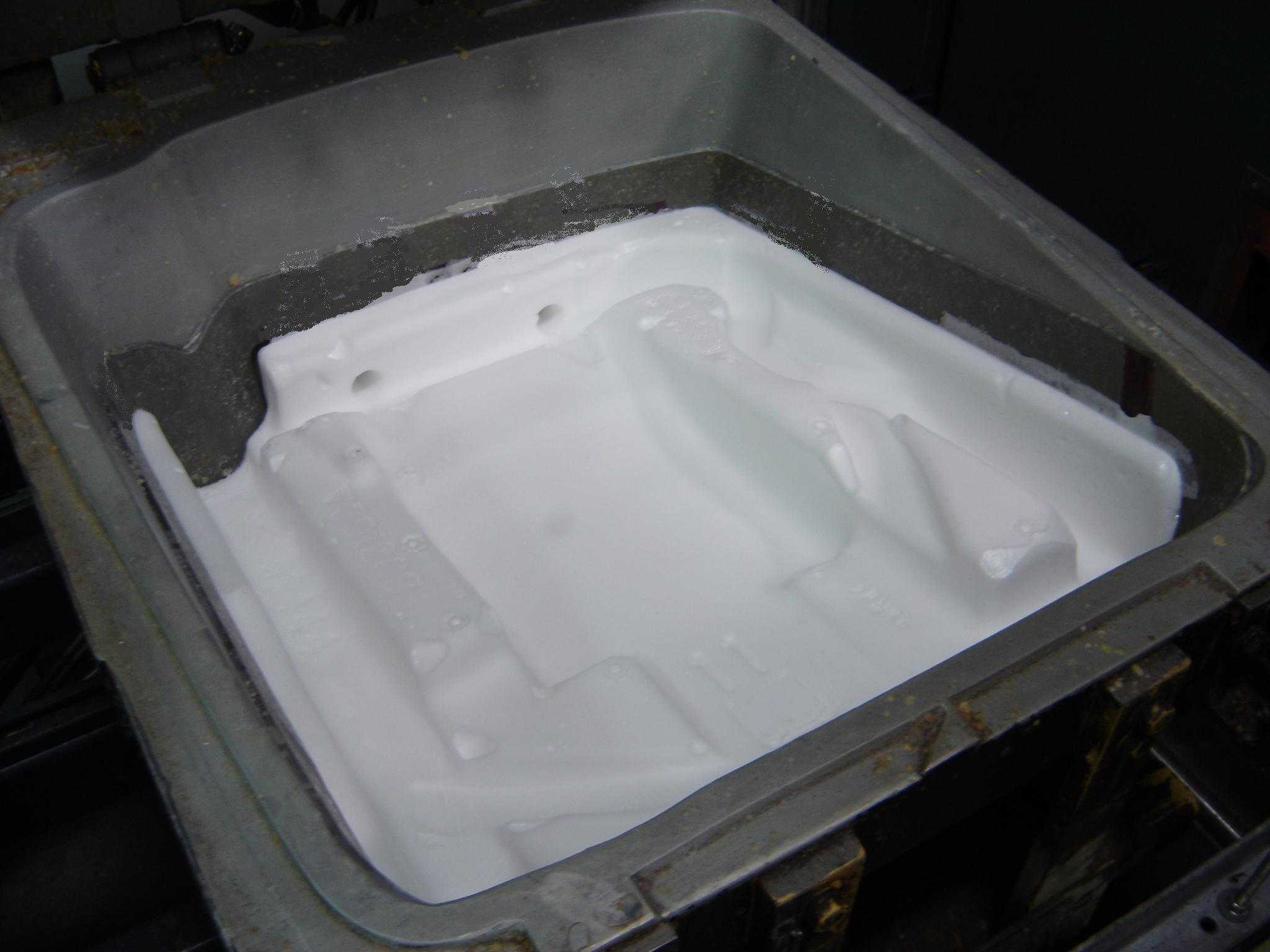
Polyurethane foam in the lower half of the mold in which it was made. When assembled into a car seat, this foam makes up the seat back. The forward-facing part of the seat back is the surface of the foam which is face-down in the mold. The two holes in the foam at the top of the picture are for the headrest posts.

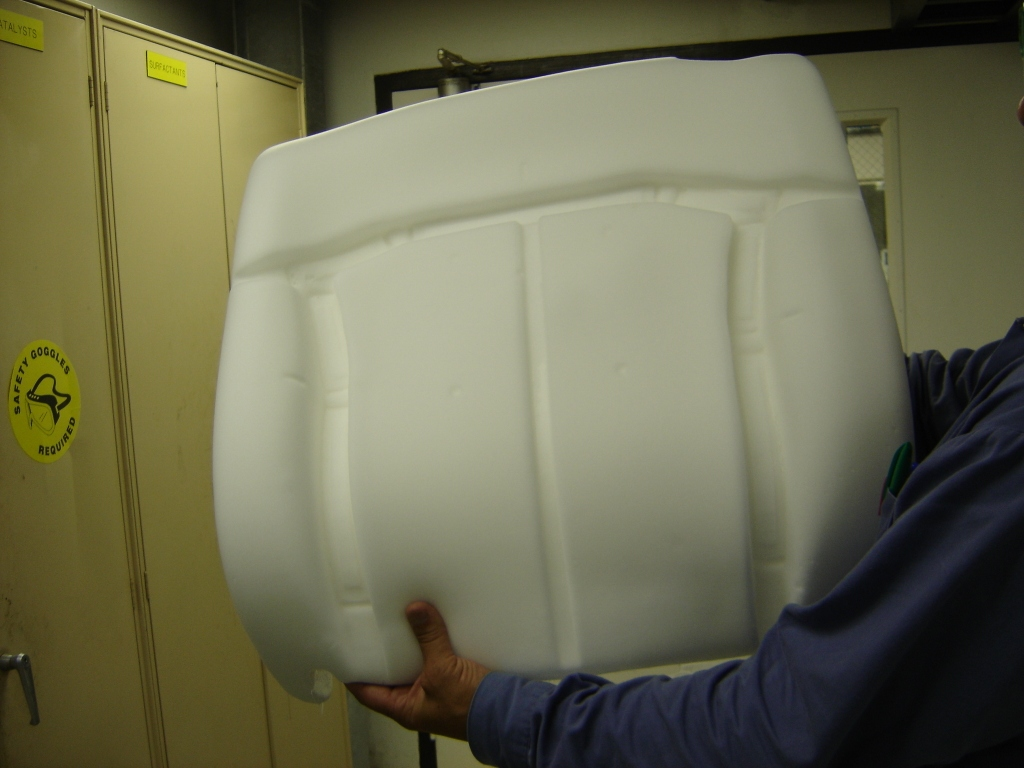
Foam seat back after removal from the mould

Polyurethanes are also used to make automobile seats. The seat manufacturer has a mold for each seat model. The mold is a closeable "clamshell" sort of structure that will allow quick casting of the seat cushion, so-called molded flexible foam, which is then upholstered after removal from the mold.

It is possible to combine these two steps, so-called in-situ, foam-in-fabric or direct moulding. A complete, fully assembled seat cover is placed in the mold and held in place by vacuum drawn through small holes in the mold. Sometimes a thin pliable plastic film backing on the fabric is used to help the vacuum work more effectively. The metal seat frame is placed into the mold and the mold closed. At this point the mold contains what could be visualized as a "hollow seat", a seat fabric held in the correct position by the vacuum and containing a space with the metal frame in place.

Polyurethane chemicals are injected by a mixing head into the mold cavity. Then the mold is held at a preset reaction temperature until the chemical mixture has foamed, filled the mold, and formed a stable soft foam. The time required is two to three minutes, depending on the size of the seat and the precise formulation and operating conditions. Then the mold is usually opened slightly for a minute or two for an additional cure time, before the fully upholstered seat is removed.

== Houses, sculptures, and decorations ==
The walls and ceiling (not just the insulation) of the futuristic Xanadu House in Florida, USA, were built out of polyurethane foam. Domed ceilings and other odd shapes are easier to make with foam than with wood. Foam was used to build oddly shaped buildings, statues, and decorations in the Seuss Landing section of the Islands of Adventure (USA) theme park. Rigid foam manufacturers sell foam that replace wood in carved sign and 3D-topography industries. PU foam is also used as a thermal insulator in many houses.

Polyurethane resin is used as an aesthetic flooring material. Being seamless and water resistant, it is gaining interest for use in (modern) interiors, especially in Western Europe. Polyurethane is also used in some domestic and commercial capacities to waterproof areas that have leaks, such as shower leaks and balcony leaks.

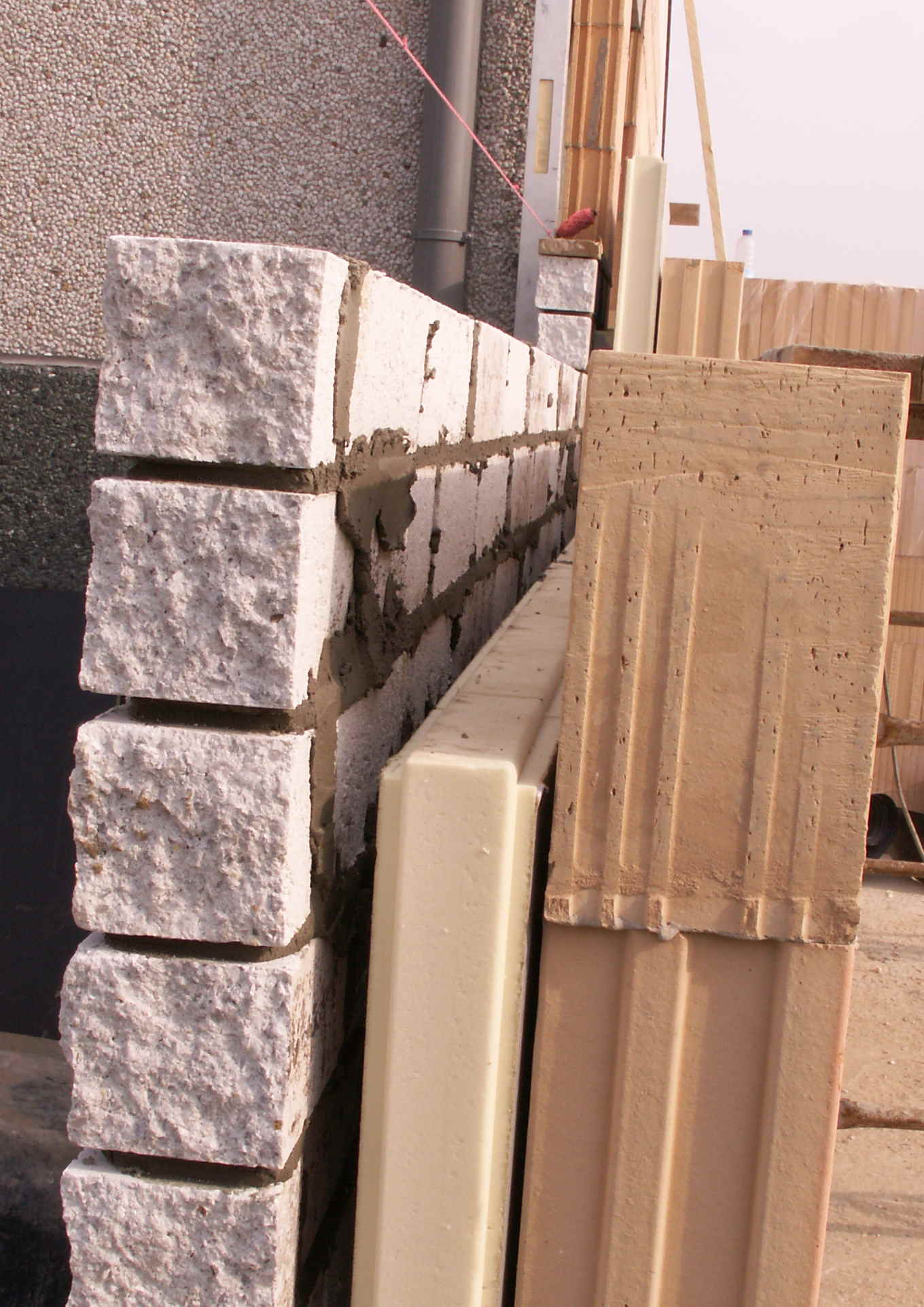
Polyurethane being used as an insulator in house construction (yellow layer).

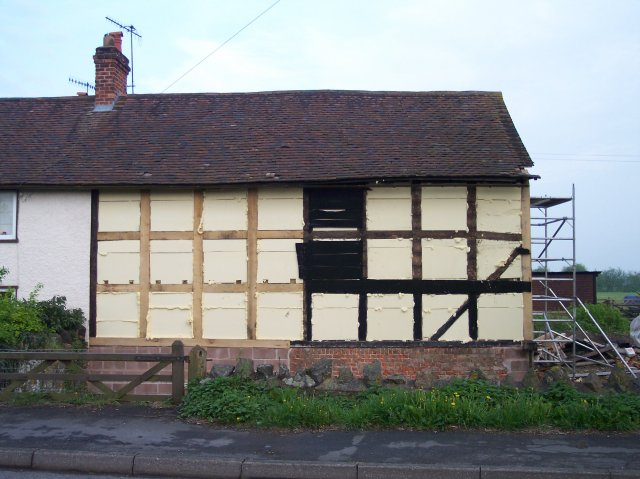
Polyurethane foam as a wall insulation

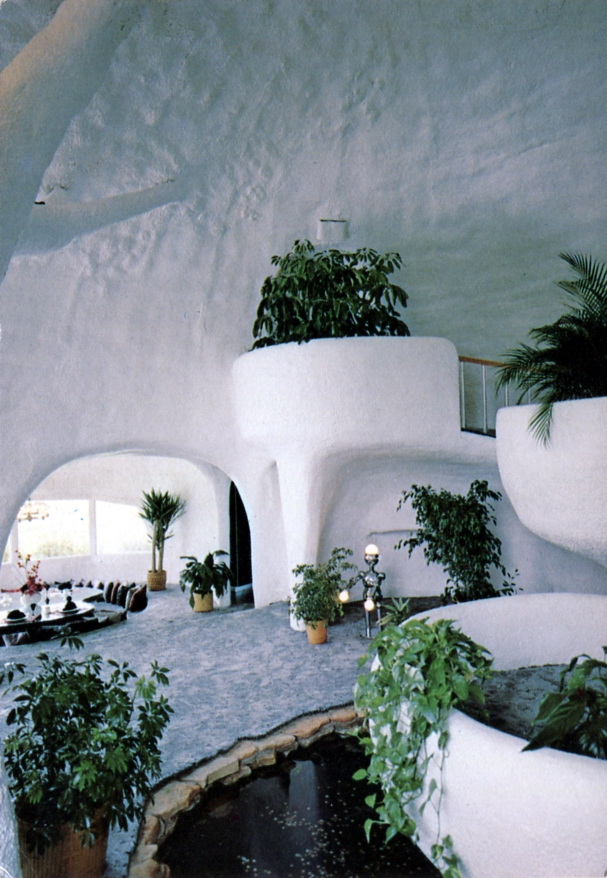
Xanadu House with polyurethane foam walls and ceiling

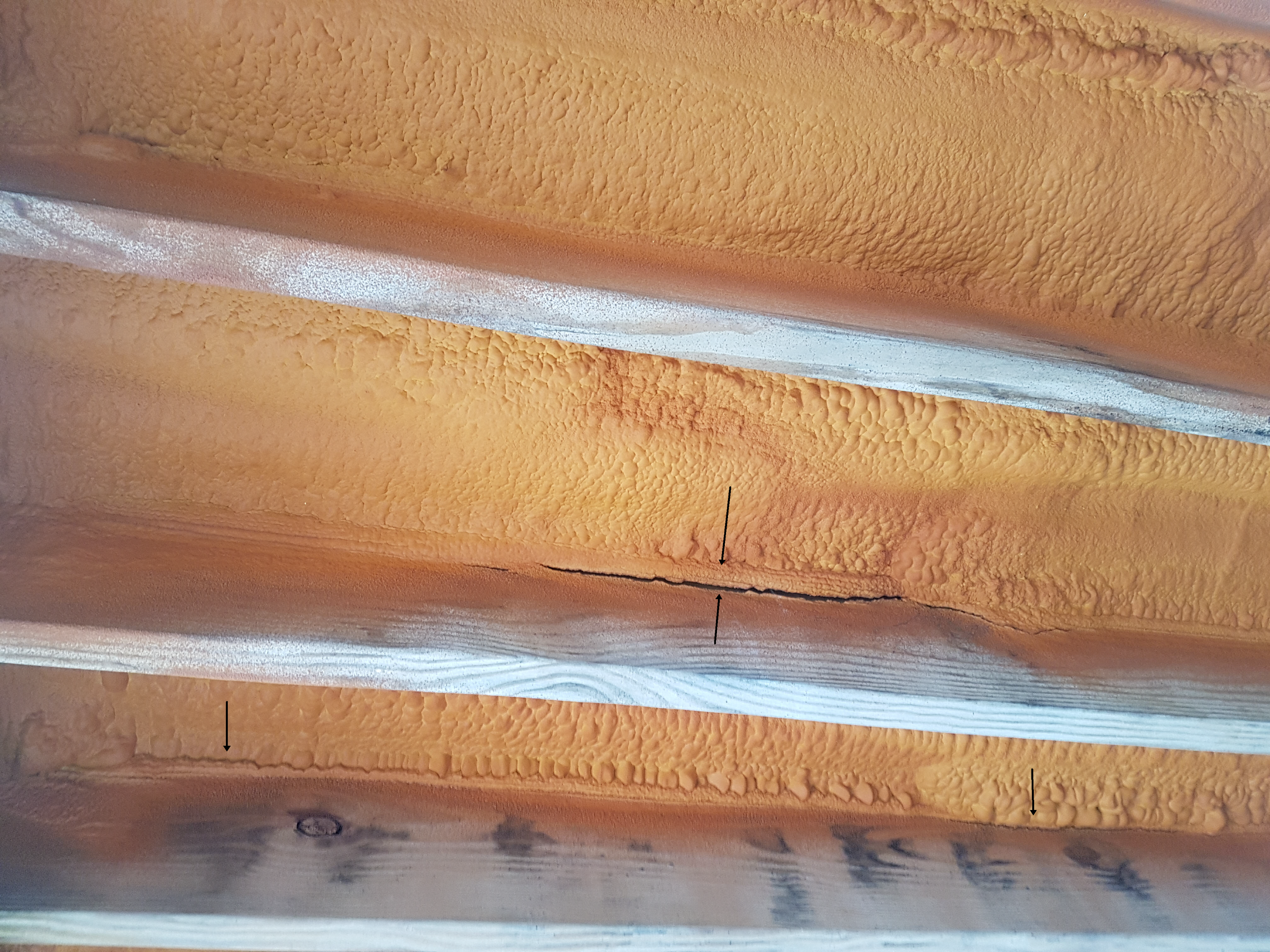
Polyurethane foam used as joist cavity insulation at a restaurant near Philadelphia, not in direct sunlight, exhibiting shrinkage at the bond interface.

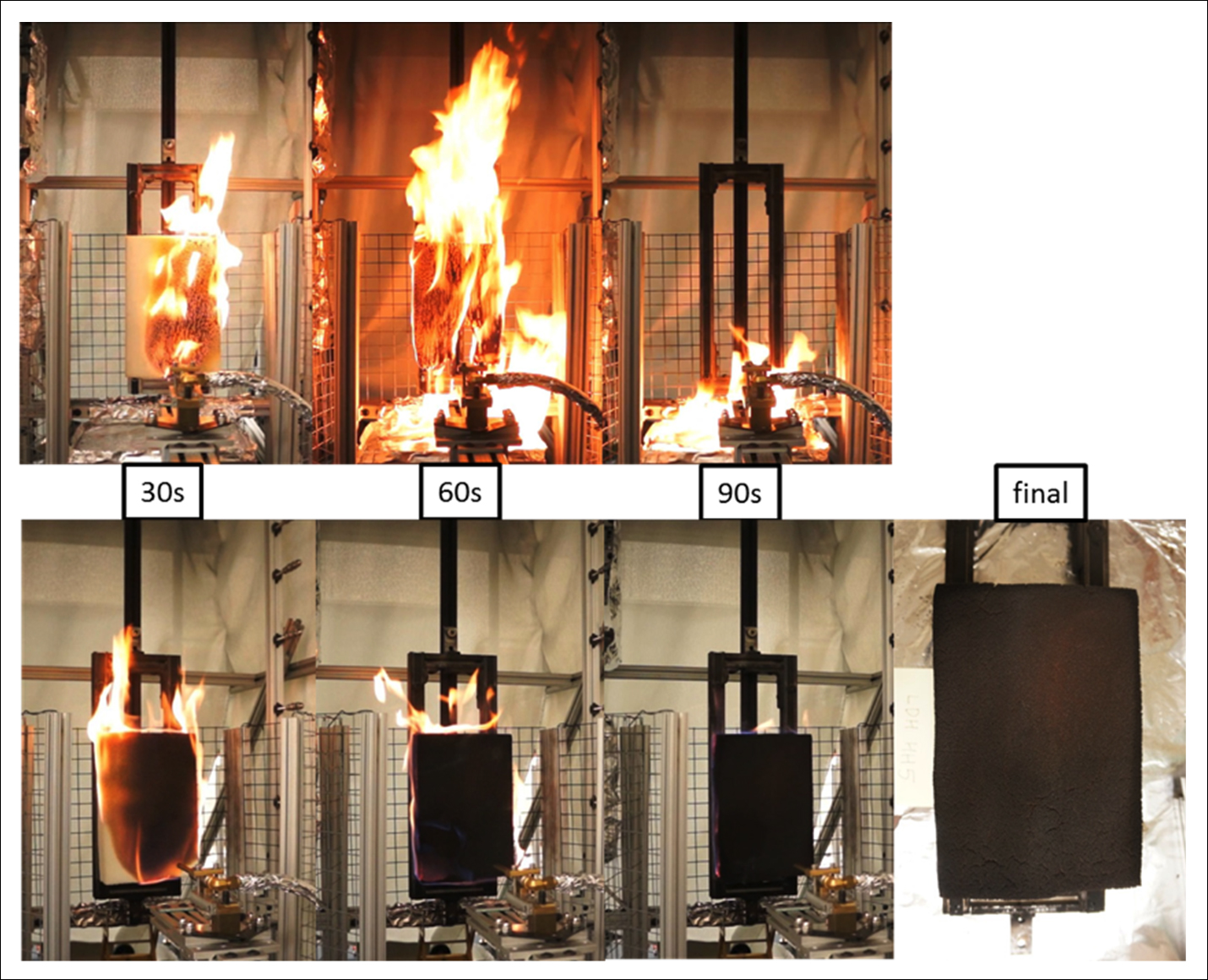
Flame test. Top, untreated polyurethane foam burns vigorously. Bottom, with fire-retardant.

== Filling of spaces and cavities ==
Two binary liquids, one of which is a polyurethane (either T6 or 16), when mixed and aerated, expand into a hard, space-filling aerosolid.

=== Construction sealants and firestopping ===
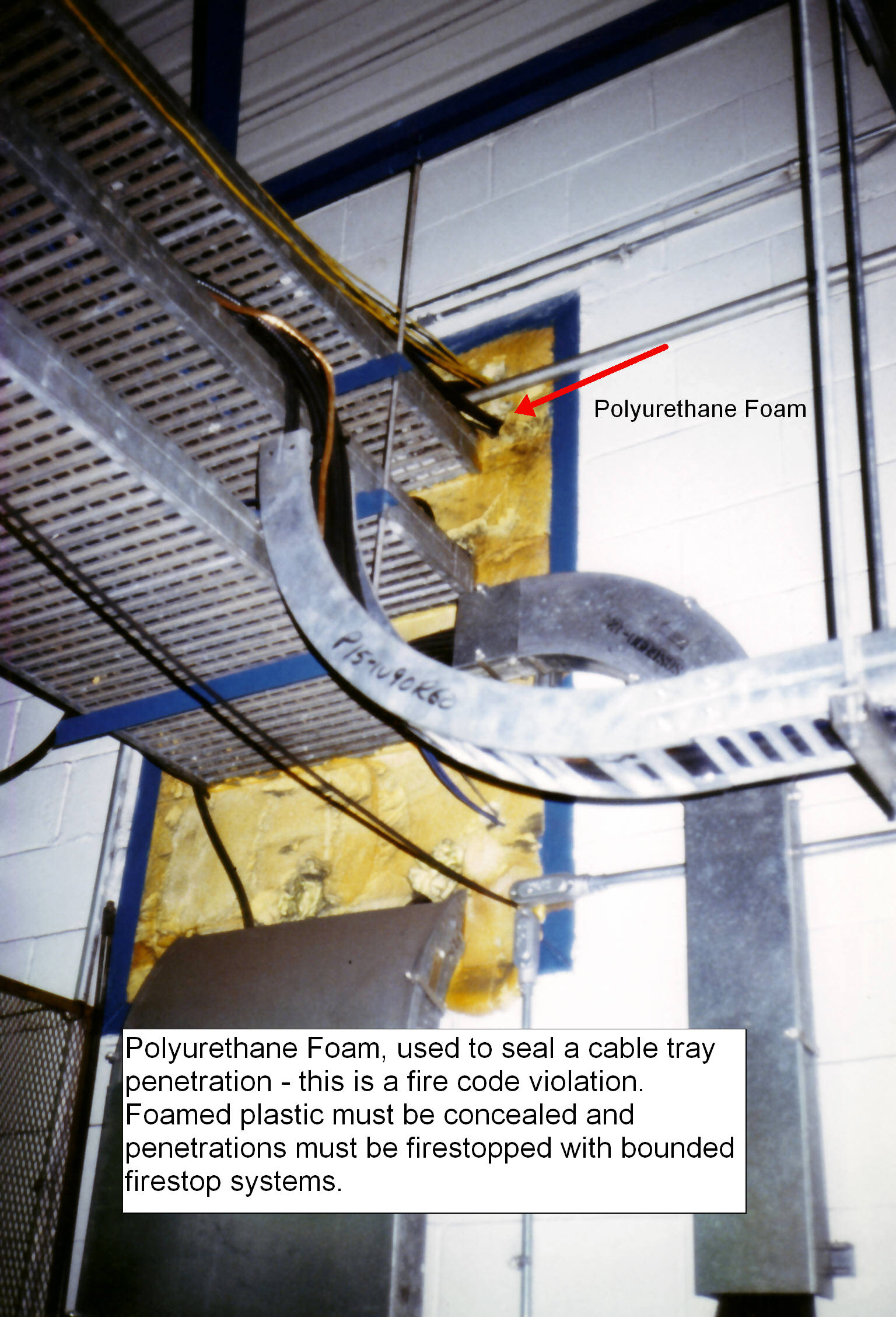
Polyurethane foam, misapplied as firestop.

Approved polyurethane sealants (which is different from foam) are available in one, two and three part systems, and in cartridges, buckets or drums. Polyurethane sealants are used to fill gaps thereby preventing air and water leakage. They are also used in conjunction with inorganic insulation, such as rockwool or ceramic fibres, for firestopping. Firestops can thwart smoke and hose-stream passage. The Browns Ferry Nuclear Power Plant used flammable polyurethane foam as a firestop, which was accidentally ignited and caused a major fire.

== Water vessels ==
Polyurethane foam is widely used in the marine world in many applications:

=== Inflatable boats ===
Some raft manufacturers use urethane for the construction of inflatable boats. AIRE uses urethane membrane material as an air-retentive bladder inside a PVC shell, whereas SOTAR uses urethane membrane materials as a coating on some boats. Maravia uses a liquid urethane material which is spray-coated over PVC to enhance air retention and increase abrasion resistance.

=== Surfboards ===
Some surfboards are made with a rigid polyurethane core. A rigid foam blank is molded, shaped to specification, then covered with fiberglass cloth and polyester resin.

=== Rigid-hulled boats ===
Some boat hulls have a rigid polyurethane foam core sandwiched between fiberglass skins. The foam provides strength, buoyancy, and sound deadening.

=== Boat decks and outdoor marine surface areas ===
Some boat decks including U.S Navy and Pakistani fishing vessels use specialized polyurethane sealants to protect from constant moisture and harsh oceanic elements. As an example, Durabak-M26 uses a custom single-part polyurethane to prevent water seepage to unwanted areas.

=== Water tanks ===
Some water tanks are insulated with polyurethane chemicals (polyol and isocyanates) to maintain water temperature for long periods of time.

== Flexible plastics ==
=== Tennis grips ===
Polyurethane has been used to make several Tennis Overgrips such as Yonex Super Grap, Wilson Pro Overgrip and many other grips. These grips are highly stretchable to ensure the grip wraps neatly around the racquet's handle.

=== Watch-band wrapping ===
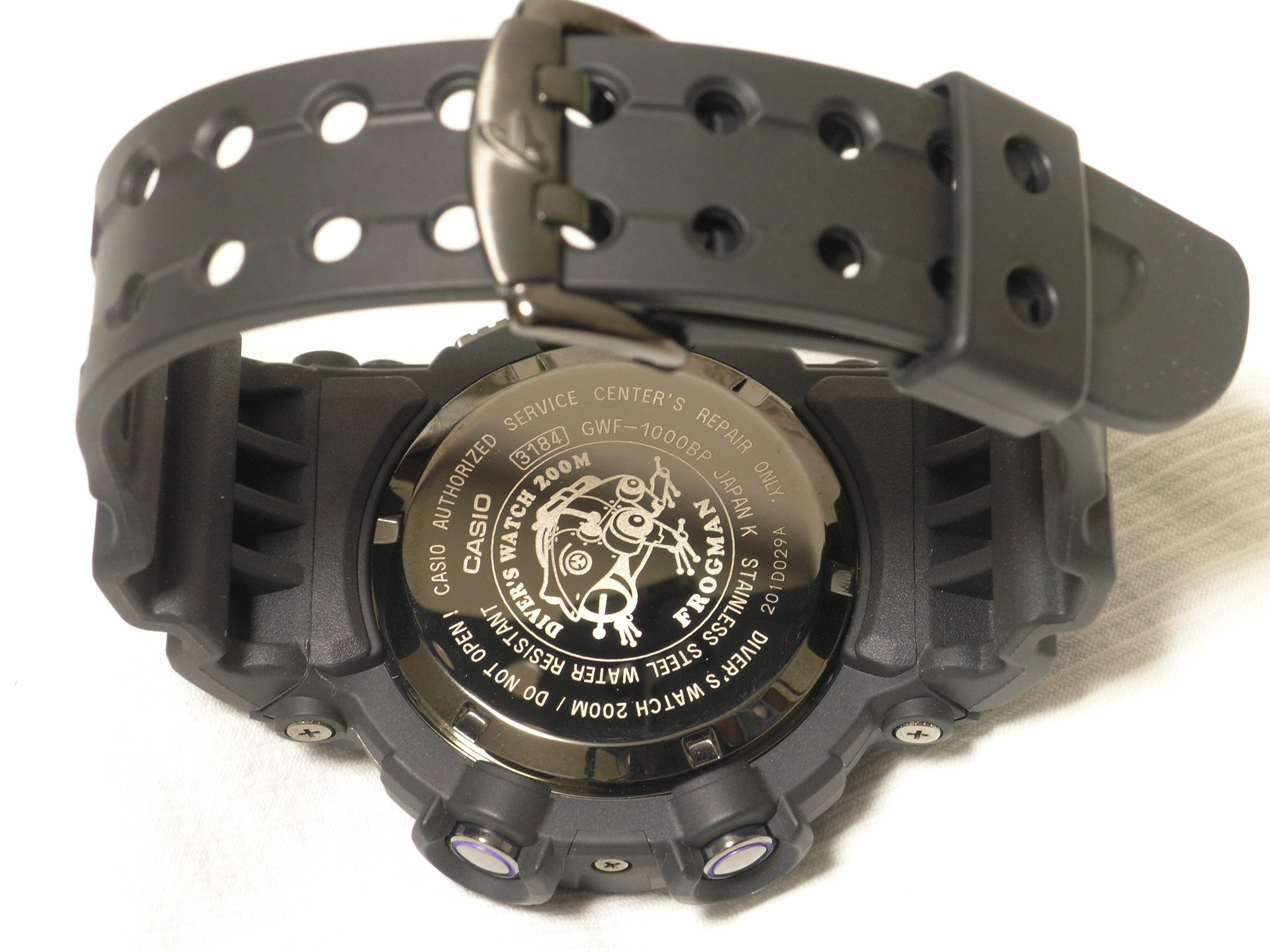
Polyurethane watch strap

Polyurethane is used as a black wrapping for timepiece bracelets over the main material which is generally stainless steel. It is used for comfort, style, and durability.

=== Textiles ===
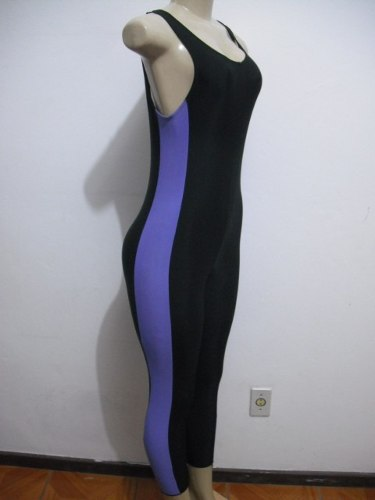
Polyurethane fiber (spandex) clothing

A thin film of polyurethane finish is added to a polyester weave to create polyurethane laminate (PUL), which is used for its waterproof and windproof properties in outerwear, diapers, shower curtains, and so forth. PU is used in some cutting-edge swimsuits to provide buoyancy for competitive swimmers. There are restrictions as the buoyancy enhances swimming performance.

A still more popular use of polyurethane in textiles is in the form of spandex, also known as elastane or by DuPont's brand name Lycra. Polyurethane fibers in the form of spandex can stretch up to 600% and still return to their original shape. Spandex is spun with other fibers, such as cotton, nylon, or polyester, to create stretchable fibers essential for clothing for both sports and fashion.

== Shoes ==
Polyurethane can be used for shoes, such as slippers and flip-flops.

== Varnish ==
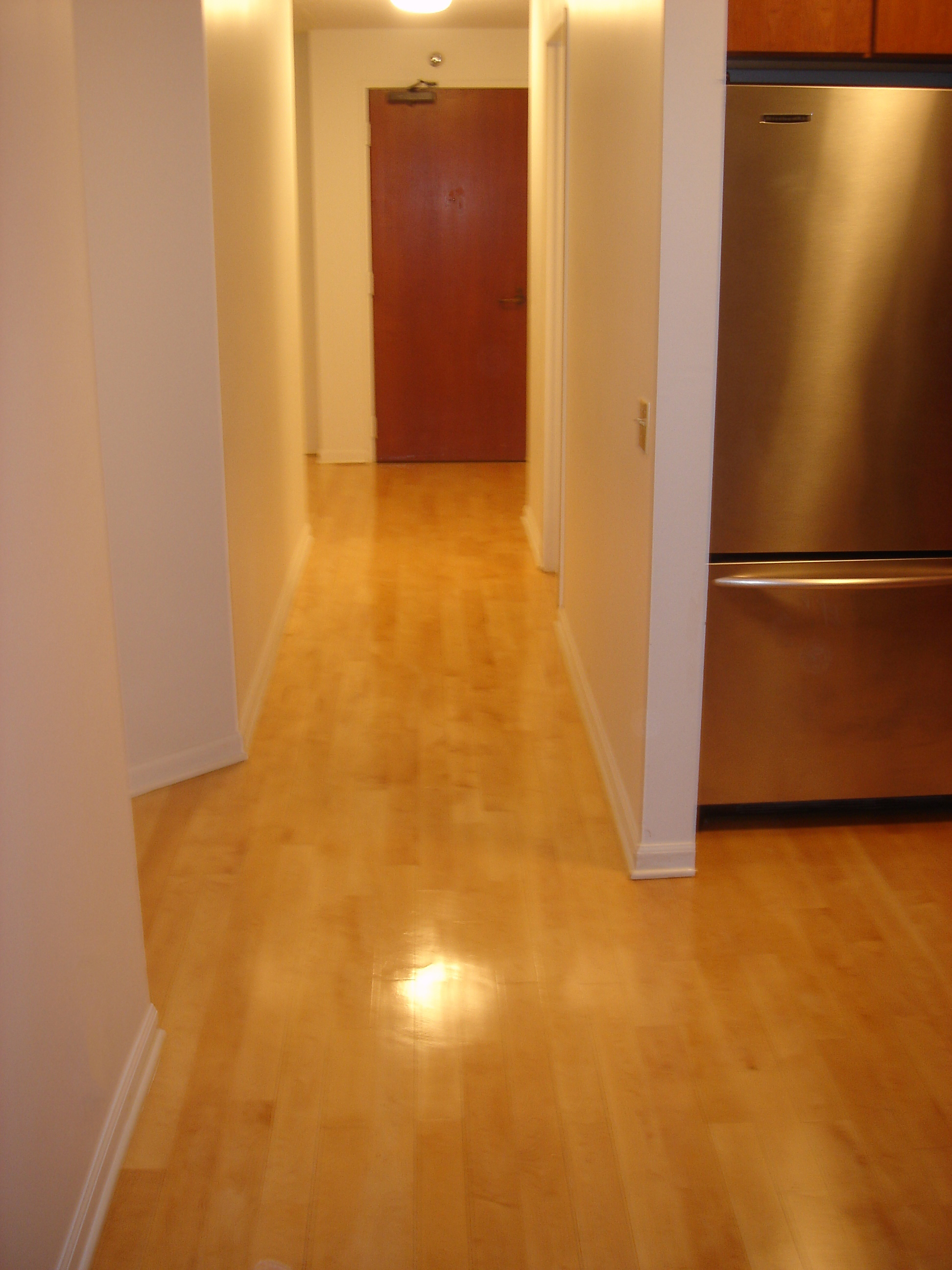
A floor with a polyurethane topcoat

Polyurethane materials are commonly formulated as paints and varnishes for finishing coats to protect or seal wood. This use results in a hard, abrasion-resistant, and durable coating that is popular for hardwood floors, but considered by some to be difficult or unsuitable for finishing furniture or other detailed pieces. Relative to oil or shellac varnishes, polyurethane varnish forms a harder film which tends to de-laminate if subjected to heat or shock, fracturing the film and leaving white patches. This tendency increases when it is applied over softer woods like pine. This is also in part due to polyurethane's lesser penetration into the wood. Various priming techniques are employed to overcome this problem, including the use of certain oil varnishes, specified "dewaxed" shellac, clear penetrating epoxy, or "oil-modified" polyurethane designed for the purpose. Polyurethane varnish may also lack the "hand-rubbed" lustre of drying oils such as linseed or tung oil; in contrast, however, it is capable of a much faster and higher "build" of film, accomplishing in two coats what may require many applications of oil. Polyurethane may also be applied over a straight oil finish, but because of the relatively slow curing time of oils, the presence of volatile byproducts of curing, and the need for extended exposure of the oil to oxygen, care must be taken that the oils are sufficiently cured to accept the polyurethane.

Unlike drying oils and alkyds which cure, after evaporation of the solvent, upon reaction with oxygen from the air, polyurethane coatings cure after evaporation of the solvent by a variety of reactions of chemicals within the original mix, or by reaction with moisture from the air. Certain products are "hybrids" and combine different aspects of their parent components. "Oil-modified" polyurethanes, whether water-borne or solvent-borne, are currently the most widely used wood floor finishes.

Exterior use of polyurethane varnish may be problematic due to its susceptibility to deterioration through ultra-violet (UV) light exposure. All clear or translucent varnishes, and indeed all film-polymer coatings (i.e., paint, stain, epoxy, synthetic plastic, etc.) are susceptible to this damage in varying degrees. Pigments in paints and stains protect against UV damage, while UV-absorbers are added to polyurethane and other varnishes (in particular "spar" varnish) to work against UV damage. Polyurethanes are typically the most resistant to water exposure, high humidity, temperature extremes, and fungus or mildew, which also adversely affect varnish and paint performance.

== Wheels ==
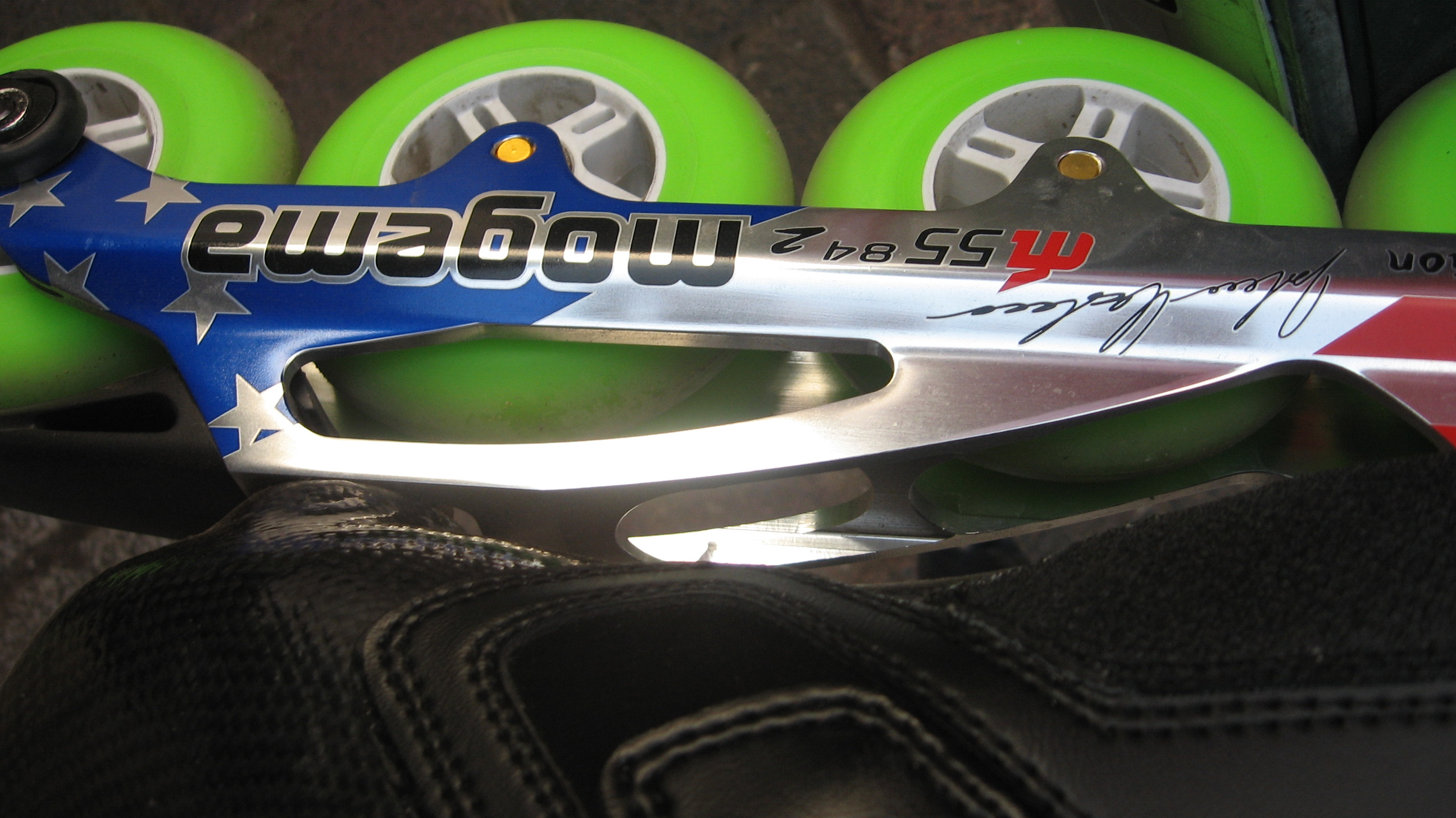
Polyurethane wheels in inline skates

Polyurethane is also used in making solid tires and wheels. Industrial applications include forklift drive and load wheels, grocery and industrial carts, and roller coaster wheels. Modern roller blading and skateboarding became economical only with the introduction of tough, abrasion-resistant polyurethane parts, helping to usher in the popularity of what had once been an obscure 1960s craze. The durability of polyurethane wheels allowed the range of tricks and stunts performed on skateboards to expand considerably. Polyurethane is also used to make small equipment tires in the lawn and garden industry for wheelbarrows, hand trucks, lawn mowers, carts, etc. They provide the bounce and feel of an air-filled tire with the benefit of no punctures. They weigh about the same as air-filled tires as well, even though they are solid polyurethane all the way through. Other constructions have been developed for pneumatic tires, and microcellular foam variants are widely used in tires on wheelchairs, bicycles and other uses. These latter foam types are also widely encountered in car steering wheels and other interior and exterior automotive parts, including bumpers and fenders.

== Automotive parts ==
Polyurethane usage has increased over the past twenty years in the automotive industry. It is being used to replace traditional rubber bushings which are known to fail or wear out on road surfaces prone to large amounts of salt and chemical debris.

Using polyurethane bushings can have many benefits like maintaining the right alignment of caster, camber and toe and thereby increasing the overall control and handling. It also increases the lifespan, provides more resistance to wear out and is less pervious to oil and similar road contaminants.

Polyurethane (PU) is popularized in the manufacturing of some of the highest quality aerodynamic components /body kits (body kits) for varying automobiles (car, truck, and SUV) on the market. These components include bumpers, side skirts, roll pans, and wiper cowls. Polyurethane allows production of durable components unlike the conventional fiberglass (FRP) that can easily break upon impact. Polyurethane is highly flexible therefore more resistant to damage. Including durability, these body kits when produced by a reputable manufacturer, exhibits less imperfections, are easy to install and maintain, and are affordable.

When fiberglass body kits begin to show cracks, chips from usual wear and tear, a well manufactured polyurethane components have similar durability to a factory installed bumper. As mentioned above, when produced by a reputable manufacturer, tend to have less pinholes and casting imperfections. Flexibility of polyurethane makes them easy to work with. Installation can be completed individually as a "do-it-yourself" project. Maintenance is extremely simple. Concerning pricing, it may vary depending on the manufacturer but are kept between an affordable range. As good as it sounds, polyurethane body kits too have its downfalls. Fiberglass or carbon fiber components are lighter in weight than most polyurethane kits. Polyurethane, again is flexible but more material and thickness is most often needed to keep adequate stiffness for road use. For drivers seeking speed for their higher performance vehicle, this can become a problem. Also, unlike fiberglass, polyurethane cannot be patched or repaired. Though it is much harder to damage, if damage did occur, the entire component must be removed and replaced. There are varying options when purchasing polyurethane kits.

== Electronic components ==
Often electronic circuit components and wires are protected from environmental influence and mechanical shock by enclosing them in polyurethane. Typically polyurethanes are selected for the excellent abrasion resistances, good electrical properties, excellent adhesion, impact strength, and low-temperature flexibility. The disadvantage of polyurethanes is the limited upper service temperature (typically 250 °F (121 °C)).

The production the electronic circuit-board manufacture would use a two-part urethane (resin and catalyst) that would be mixed and poured onto the circuit assembly (see resin dispensing). In most cases, after the urethane cures, the completed circuit board would not be repairable. Because of its physical properties and low cost, polyurethane encapsulation (potting) is a popular option in the automotive manufacturing sector for automotive circuits and sensors.

== Adhesives ==
Polyurethane can be used as an adhesive, especially as a woodworking glue. Its main advantage over more traditional wood glues is its water resistance. It was introduced to the general North American market in the 1990s as Gorilla Glue and Excel, but had been available in Europe much earlier. Polyurethane is the basis for some construction adhesives in a caulking tube format.

On the way to a new and better glue for bookbinders, a new adhesive system was introduced for the first time in 1985. The base for this system is polyether or polyester, whereas polyurethane (PUR) is used as prepolymer. Its special features are coagulation at room temperature and resistance to moisture.

First generation (1988)

- Low starting solidity
- High viscosity
- Cure time >3 days

Second generation (1996)

- Low starting solidity
- High viscosity
- Cure time <3 days

Third generation (2000)

- Good starting solidity
- Low viscosity
- Cure time between 6 and 16 hours

Fourth generation (present)

- Good starting solidity
- Very low viscosity
- Cure reached within a few seconds due to dual-core systems

Advantages of polyurethane glue in the bookbinding industry:

- PUR is better than hotmelt or cold glue for most applications. Because of the lack of moisture in the glue, paper with contrary grain direction can be glued without problems. Even printed and supercalendered paper can be bound without problems. It is the most economical glue, with a theoretical application thickness of 0.01 mm. However, in actual use, it is not practical to apply less than 0.03 mm.
- PUR glue is weather-proof, and stable at temperatures from −40 °C (−40 °F) to 100 °C (212 °F).

== Abrasion resistant coating ==
Thermoset polyurethanes are also used as a protective coating against abrasion. Cast polyurethane over materials such as steel will absorb particle impact more efficiently. Polyurethanes have been proven to last in excess of 25 years in abrasive environments where non-coated steel would erode in less than 8 years. Polyurethanes are used in industries such as:

- Mining and mineral processing
- Aggregate
- Transportation
- Concrete
- Paper processing
- Power
- Inflatable boat manufacture

Polyurethane is also used in the concrete construction industry to create formliners. Polyurethane formliners serves as a mold for concrete, creating a variety of textures and art.

== Other applications ==
=== Solid-fuel rockets ===
Polyurethane is used together with Ammonium perchlorate as solid fuel in the submarine launched Polaris missiles.

=== Body armor ===
Polyurethane urea elastomers have been investigated by researchers from the U.S. Army Research Laboratory and the Massachusetts Institute of Technology for potential material for helmets, face shields, and ballistic vests for soldiers.

=== Inorganic plant substrates ===
Sheet and flaked semi-open cell hydrophilic polyurethane foams have found application in roof gardens and vertical green walls with commercial products now emerging on the market. Semi-open cell polyurethane foams substrates have much lower density and far greater water holding capacities than soil substrates. The semi-open cell structure facilitate the required plant root attachment for vertical wall gardens. Reductions in weight reduce building/wall supporting structure requirements, whilst increased water holding capacity reduces plant watering requirements.

=== Concrete raising ===
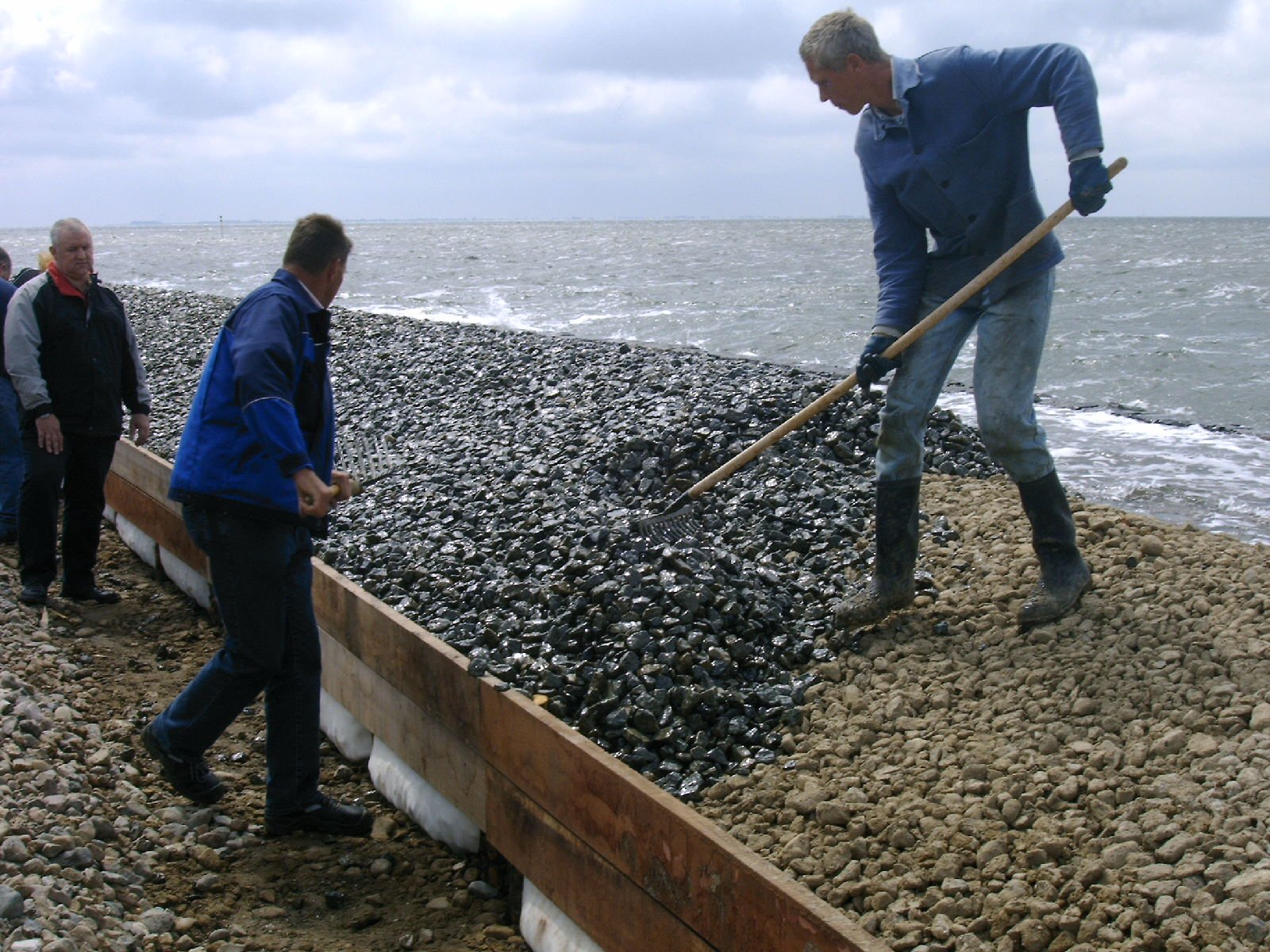
PU-containing sea defenses being installed on Hallig Gröde, an island off the German coast

Closed cell polymers have been used to raise and support concrete roadways and bridge approaches since 1989. Originally developed in Europe and patented by Uretek, this method of concrete leveling is now widely used in residential, commercial and municipal applications. Common applications include repairing settled sidewalks, driveways, patios and garage floors. In the US it is sometimes known as slabjacking.

=== Concrete substitute ===
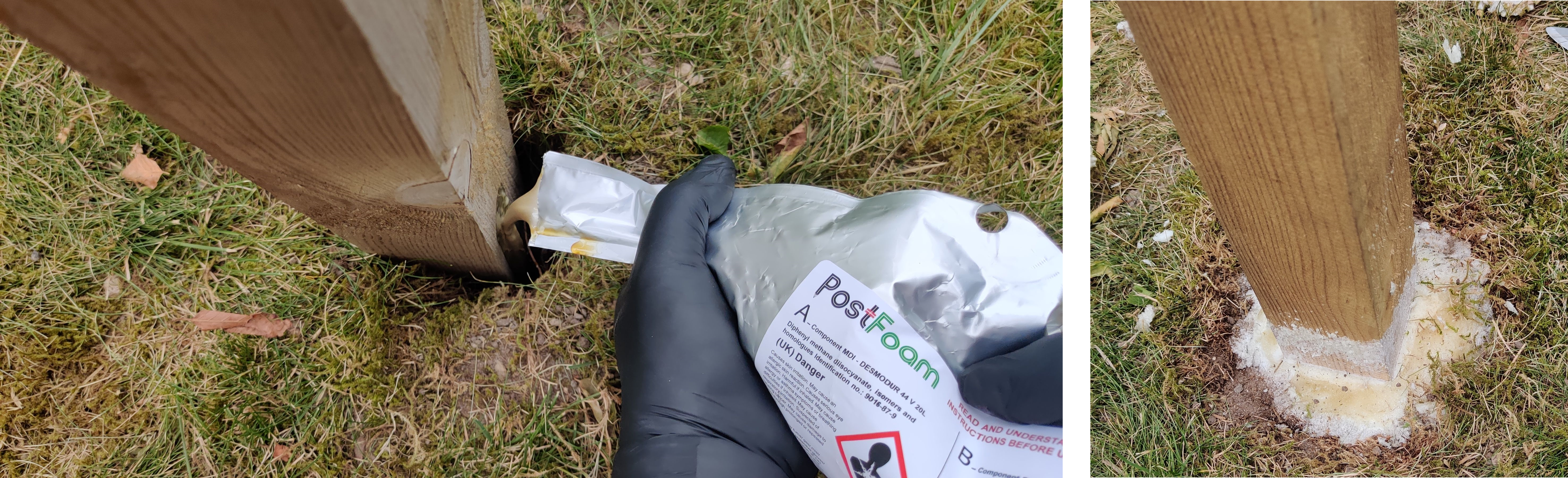
Polyurethane foam as backfill

Closed cell polyurethane foam can be used as backfill in applications where the high density and compression strength of concrete are not necessary. In addition to being considerably lighter than concrete, the closed cell nature of the material prevents the transfer of moisture to the structure being supported which can reduce the risk or rot or corrosion.

=== Seawall Repair ===
Environmental variables, natural wear and tear, and weather conditions, can all cause damage to concrete seawalls. These problems can erode the structure over time, rendering it more susceptible to further harm. Traditionally repair has required an in depth process using concrete, however geofoam is a lightweight and long-lasting substance that has become increasingly popular to repair damaged seawalls.
