= Studcast =

Type of concrete

Studcast concrete, also called "pre-framed concrete", combines relatively thin concrete layers with cold formed steel framing to create hybrid panels; the result is a panelized system usable for cladding, curtain walls, shaft walls, and load-bearing exterior and interior walls. Studcast panels install in the same manner as prefabricated steel stud panels. The technology is applicable for both factory prefabrication and site-cast (tilt-up) wall construction on almost all types of buildings, including multifamily housing, schools, industrial, commercial and institutional structures.

== History ==
Studcast walls are prefabricated, ready-to-erect, high-performance concrete walls that weigh half as much as standard concrete walls. A hybrid between architectural precast concrete and panelized light-gage cold-formed steel framing, studcast walls combine the best features of each material in a way nullifies each material's weaknesses. They have been widely used as an exterior and interior wall system for over a decade.

Studcast concrete was developed by combining the best aspects of two familiar technologies: the durability, fast erection, and architectural versatility of precast concrete and the light weight and high strength of panelized cold-formed steel stud framing. Both materials are widely available and relatively affordable; the benefit of studcast lies in joining them in a complementary and affordable manner that eliminates each of their disadvantages.

Studcast is a hybrid precast wall system that is lightweight, sustainable, fast-erecting, and compatible with a wide range of designs and architectural finishes. These composite walls can be made with as little as two inches of concrete thickness, as compared to six-to-ten inches for the typical precast panel. Utilizing lightweight aggregate, walls can weigh as little as 18 pounds/square foot (psf). For reference, a six-inch panel of ordinary precast concrete weighs about 70 psf.

The strength-to-weight ratio is high. The precast units can support their own weight and be lifted off the casting tables only 24 hours after casting, making cycle-time short and efficient. Large panel sizes are practical to cast and light enough to handle with lighter equipment, resulting in fewer panels to erect and fewer panel joints to seal.

Double-sided studcast walls were awarded the Hospitality Design and ASID Earth Minded Award for a product in 2009. They were cited for their role in sustainable hospitality design.

== Benefits & Sustainability ==
Both the material and process fit within the principles of sustainable construction.

A studcast wall is both frame and skin. It can be dropped into place and bolted down, framing and enclosing the structure in a single step. This creates time and material savings that can potentially substantially reduce construction costs and time. This is also an environmental benefit, as reducing construction time reduces energy consumption of construction equipment and the impact of workers on the site.

It has a built-in cavity for insulating materials and utilities. It needs no additional furring to receive interior finishes.

Because studcast is made of concrete and steel, it does not support mold growth or pest infestation. It is also highly resistant to moisture infiltration, freeze/thaw, and condensation. It releases no volatile organic compounds (VOCs).

The automated roll forming system produces components to the exact length needed so there is minimal waste.

Recycled material can be incorporated into studcast. Recycled steel can be used as raw material for the studs. The concrete can contain recycled aggregate and be made from locally extracted materials. Some manufacturers have 25% or more recycled content.

Because each square foot of wall weighs so little, transportation-related energy consumption and pollution are kept to a minimum, as is shipping cost. At the job site, walls can be handled with light equipment. For a low-rise structure - for instance a school or commercial building - a fork lift is all that is needed to erect a wall.

The low mass of the wall requires smaller foundations. This is a two-fold environmental benefit: first for the reduction in consumption and transportation of raw materials in general; second for the reduced consumption specifically of portland cement, whose production emits large quantities of carbon dioxide (CO_{2}), a greenhouse gas.

Low mass walls have an additional benefit in high seismic activity zones, where they translate into less force shaking the structure during earthquake events.

== Applications ==
Studcast has both architectural and structural applications. It has been used in hospitality design, military construction, retail, commercial, industrial, and residential design.

Specific applications include:

- Free-standing temporary or permanent concrete walls
- Cladding
- Structural interior or exterior walls
- Curtainwall

== Appearance ==
The versatility of architectural precast is well established and continually expanding due to the creativity of designers and innovation of precasters. The heavy weight of concrete panels remains a limiting factor, however. That entire gamut of aesthetic possibilities applies to studcast, in a package that can weigh only 20% of a typical precast panel.

The fine texture of the concrete makes it well suited to architectural finishes. It is also compatible with integral color. Form liners can be used to mold a variety of textures into the wall surface. These might include simulated masonry or stone textures, even carvings or decorative patterns. Architectural veneers such as thin brick or thin genuine stone are also options. Innovative materials such as crushed glass could also be cast into the surface.

The material is also suitable for decorative operations after casting. Carving, rasping, and gouging with hand-tools can create textures or contouring. Routed lines and grooves, reveals, digital cutting, and other power-tool working are also possible.

== Production ==
Studcast is typically prefabricated for improved efficiency and quality control. The designer's CAD drawings are converted into computer instructions for a machine that transforms a coil of flat steel into precisely-cut and shaped studs and rails. Every bend and perforation needed to assemble the steel is also performed.

Workers assemble the cut pieces into panels using simple tools; no specialized clamps or jigs are required. The panels are accurate to within 1/32 inch over 60 feet (20 m).

Lightweight concrete slurry is pumped into the panel until the steel frame is partially embedded. Various methods are used to create composite action between steel and concrete, and add sheer resistance and impact resistance.

== See also ==
- Precast concrete
- Tilt up
- Steel framing
- Sustainable design
