= Overlay architecture =

Overlay architecture, or Overlay, is "event architecture", such as the temporary elements that are added to more permanent buildings to enable the operation of major sporting events or festivals. These elements provide additional facilities for the duration of an event and are generally of lightweight construction, as they are often removed afterwards.

== Use ==
The role of overlay is extensive and can cover all aspects of a major event, starting with the "back of house" user groups, including staff, operations, officials, broadcast, media, hospitality, VIPs and the athletes themselves. These groups all require physical facilities to provide accreditation, accommodation, segregation and wayfinding, which need to be separated from, but connected to, the spectators at the "front of house", to preserve the magic and mystery of the event experience. It is important that the overlay design is integrated into the masterplan of major events at an early stage, in order that the flow of people through the site can be effectively managed and sufficient space provided for the various overlay facilities. The overlay design also has a significant role in helping to define the overall environment of a major event. By taking a design-inclusive approach and considering the cultural and design aspects alongside the commercial and functional requirements, memorable places and spaces can be created out of simple components and hired commodities.

== Overlay categories ==
Overlay can be categorised in three main ways:

- Existing facilities: the overlay consists of temporary elements being added to an existing space to accommodate the specific needs of an event (e.g. the Excel Centre, or the Archery range at Lord's Cricket Ground)
- New facilities: the overlay consists of temporary elements that are integrated with permanent elements in a new facility or venue for an event (e.g. the Olympic Stadium)
- Temporary facilities: the overlay creates a completely temporary facility or venue for an event (e.g. the Beach Volleyball court at Horse Guards Parade, or the Equestrian Centre at Greenwich Park)
