= Dyecrete =

Method of coloring concrete

The Dyecrete Process is a method of adding dye to permanently color concrete.
