= Concrete leveling =

Process to level concrete by levelling its underlying foundation

In civil engineering, concrete leveling is a procedure that attempts to correct an uneven concrete surface by altering the foundation on which the surface sits. It is a cheaper alternative to having replacement concrete poured and is commonly performed at small businesses and private homes as well as at factories, warehouses, airports and on roads, highways and other infrastructure.

== Causes of settlement ==
Concrete slabs can be susceptible to settlement from a wide variety of factors, the most common being an inconsistency of moisture in the soil. Soil expands and contracts as the levels of moisture fluctuate during the dry and rainy seasons. In some parts of the United States, naturally occurring soils can consolidate over time, including areas ranging from Texas up through to Wisconsin. Soil erosion also contributes to concrete settlement, which is common for locations with improper drainage. Concrete slabs built upon filled-in land can excessively settle as well. This is common for homes with basement levels since the backfill on the outside of the foundation frequently is not compacted properly. In some cases, poorly designed sidewalk or patio slabs direct water towards the basement level of a structure. Tree roots can also have an impact on concrete as well, actually powerful enough to lift a slab upwards or breakthrough entirely; this is common along public roadways, especially within metropolitan areas.

Concrete settlement, uneven concrete surfaces, and uneven footings can also be caused by seismic activity especially in earthquake-prone countries including Japan, New Zealand, Turkey, and the United States.

== Slabjacking ==
"Slabjacking" is a specialty concrete repair technology. In essence, slabjacking attempts to lift a sunken concrete slab by pumping a substance through the concrete, effectively pushing it up from below. The process is also commonly referred to as "mudjacking" and "pressure grouting.”

Accounts of raising large concrete slabs through the use of hydraulic pressure date back to the early 20th century. Early contractors used a mixture of locally available soils (sometimes including crushed limestone and/or cement for strength), producing a "mud-like" substance and thus the term "mudjacking." In recent years, some slabjacking contractors began using expanding polyurethane foam. Each method has its benefits and disadvantages.

The slabjacking process generally starts with drilling access holes in the concrete, strategically located to maximize lift. These holes range in size from 3/8" up to 3" depending on the process used.

Initial material injections fill any under slab void space. Once the void space is filled, subsequent injections will start lifting the concrete within minutes. After the slabs are lifted, the access holes are patched and the work is complete. The process is rapid when compared to traditional remove and replace applications and is minimally disturbing to the surrounding areas.

Slabjacking technology has several benefits, including:

- Cost – can be significantly less expensive than new concrete
- Timeliness of the repair – concrete is typically usable within hours as opposed to days with new concrete
- Minimal or no environmental impact – mostly due to keeping waste out of landfills
- Aesthetic – does not disturb the surrounding area and landscaping

Slabjacking also has some limitations, including:

- Concrete must be in fairly sound condition – if there are too many cracks, replacement might be the only option
- New cracks can occur as the slab is lifted – most would have already been present, just not visible before lifting
- Possible resettlement – if concrete poured on top of poorly compacted soils it can still sink further. However, this is also possible with new concrete.

Slabjacking can typically be broken down into three main process types:

=== Mudjacking ===
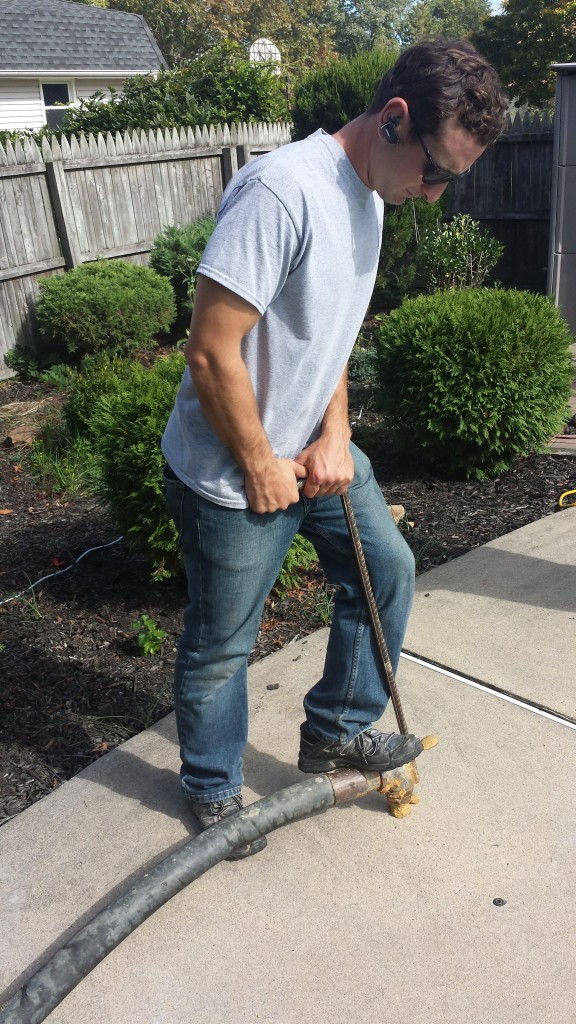
Mudjacking

The term Mudjacking originates from using a mixture of topsoil and portland cements injected underground to hydraulically lift concrete slabs. Mudjacking can be achieved with a variety of mixtures. The most common being a local soil or sand blend, mixed with water and cement. Other additives may be included in the mixture for increased "pumpability"/lubrication, improved strength/curing times, or as a filler. Additives that may be present include: clay/bentonite, fly ash, pond sand, pea gravel, masonry cements, or crushed lime. This process typically requires holes between 1" and 2" in diameter. This "mud" is injected under the concrete slabs, oftentimes using a movable pump that can access most slabs. Once the void under the slab is filled, the pressure builds under the slab, lifting the concrete back into place. Once in place, the holes are filled with a color-matching grout.

Benefits of mudjacking:

- Low-pressure lifting of slab
- Finely controlled lifting of the slab
- Possible to achieve higher compressive strength than foam leveling
- Budget-friendly
- Equipment can access locations at longer distances than poly foam
- Environmentally friendly. Accepted at concrete recycling facilities unlike poly foam and does not need to be separated from the concrete

Disadvantages of mudjacking:

- Typically shorter warranty periods than what's offered by polyurethane foam contractors.
- Requires more clean-up afterward compared to foam leveling
- Largest holes of the three main processes
- Can be a slower process due to the smaller material volume of the movable cart.
- Does not resist erosion or fill voids as well as polyurethane foam.

=== Limestone grout leveling ===
This method uses a pulverized limestone, commonly called agricultural lime. mixed with water, and sometimes Portland cement, to create a slurry about the consistency of a thick milkshake. This slurry is pumped hydraulically beneath the slab through 1" holes. Because of its semi-fluid nature, it pushes against itself, filling voids beneath the slab. Once the void is filled, pressure builds, slowly lifting the slab into place. Due to the low pressure of this method, trained professionals are able to control the lift of the concrete slab precisely, without the worry of lifting too far. This also decreases the likelihood of cracking or damaging the slab further. Once the slab is lifted into place, the holes are filled with a color-matching non-shrink grout.

Even though the injection pressure is relatively low, compared to Foam Leveling, Stone Slurry Grout Leveling has a high compressive strength of 240 pounds per square inch. This is equal to 34,560 pounds of lifting force per square foot. With Portland cement added, this can increase to over 6,000 psi or 864,000 pounds per square foot. Once the slurry dries it creates a near-solid stone foundation for the leveled concrete (much like the original stone base the concrete was poured upon.)

Benefits of stone slurry grout leveling

- Low-pressure lifting of slabs
- Finely controlled lifting of the slab
- When the limestone grout dries out, it creates a hard subsurface for the concrete slab
- Smaller holes than mudjacking
- Highest compressive strength among the three methods
- Environmentally friendly
- Budget-friendly

Disadvantages of stone slurry grout leveling:

- Requires more clean-up afterward compared with foam leveling
- Slabs to be lifted must typically be within 100 feet of the truck-based pumping equipment
- Larger holes than foam leveling
- Without sufficient cement, rainwater can erode limestone leveling materials resulting in re-settlement

=== Expanding structural foam leveling ===
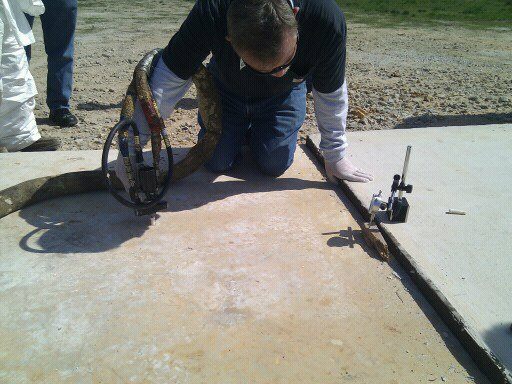
Concrete leveling with foam injection

Foam leveling uses polyurethane in an injection process. A two-part polymer is injected through a hole less than one inch in diameter. Although the material is injected at a higher pressure than traditional cementitious grouts, the pressure is not what causes the lifting. The expansion of the air bubbles in the injected material below the slab surface performs the actual lifting action as the liquid resin reacts and becomes a structural foam. The material injected below a slab to be lifted will first find weak soils, expanding into them in such a manner as to consolidate and cause sub-soils to become denser and fill any voids below the slab. One inherent property of expanding foams is that they will follow the path of least resistance, expanding in all directions. Another inherent property includes reaching a hydro-insensitive or hydrophobic state when cured with 100% cure times as little as 30 minutes. Closed-cell injections will not retain moisture and are not subject to erosion once in place.

Some closed-cell polymer foams have baseline lifting capabilities of 6,000 lbs per sq. ft. [CONVERT] and leveling procedures have been performed in which loads as high as 125 tons have been lifted and stabilized in a surface area of less than 900 sq. ft. Some foams are even stronger, with compressive strengths of 50 psi and 100 psi in a free rise state. That is equal to 7,200–14,000 lbs. per square ft. [CONVERT] of support.

Benefits of Expanding Structural Foam Leveling

- Meets compressive strength requirements when supporting highway slabs
- Consumers benefit from longer warranty periods with Polyurethane Foam
- Requires less clean up than Mudjacking or Limestone Grout Leveling
- Smaller holes
- Mobile units can reach areas inaccessible to truck-based equipment
- Does not retain moisture
- Does not erode when subjected to rainwater

Disadvantages of expanding structural foam leveling:

- Requires specially trained technicians to properly install
- Greater technical skills required for operations and maintenance of equipment
- Intense heat can build up from improper installation of polyurethane
- Environmentally un-friendly as polyurethane is a plastic
- Potential toxicity of Structural Foam Dust
- Can stick to and permanently stain other surrounding surfaces
- Derived from crude oil, shipped to refineries, manufacturing plants, consumers and ultimately to job sites creating a negative environmental impact resulting in additional output of CO_{2} and burning of fuel.
- Intense heat can build up causing self combustion and flammability of polyurethane from improper installation
