= Form liner =

Form liners are the liners used in the preparation of designs on concrete walls. The use of form liners often results in more attractive walls for highways, neighborhoods, beaches and parks. Form liners come in many different shapes and designs, and can produce a variety of different results on concrete.

The process typically begins with a determination that an aesthetically interesting barrier is needed. Then concept drawings are made by the design team and presented for approval. Once the design is accepted by the surrounding neighborhood and building team, the drawings evolve into sculptured creations. The sculptor can create the original work using a variety of mediums, such as clay, polyurethane and wax. When the masterwork is finished, a cast is made using synthetic liquid rubber, and from this cast, form liners are produced in the reverse image of the original.

A form liner panel is placed on the inside of a concrete forming system before the concrete has been poured and acts as a mold for the concrete to be formed against. Once the concrete has set, the forming system can be removed and the form liner can be stripped from the hardened concrete surface. The resulting concrete surface is permanently textured with the pattern of the form liner.

== Types ==
There are several different types of form liners, which vary based on the application. Single-use form liners are usually made of styrene plastic and are normally discarded after the first use. Multi-use form liners are usually made of ABS plastic and range in number of uses from 2 to 10 or more. Multiple-reuse form liners are usually made of polyurethane, a heavy rubber material known for its reusability and used frequently by departments of transportation on sound walls, bridges and other applications. Other form liner materials used can include polystyrene foam, fiberglass, and even aluminum-- styrene plastic, ABS plastic, and urethane are considered to be the industry standard, and are most often specified in plans by architects and engineers.

The form liners are attached to forms and concrete is placed against the liner. The liner pattern is transferred into the wet concrete. After the concrete has cured, the liner is stripped and the unique sculpture is exposed.

== Origins ==
Architectural elastomeric urethane form liners were pioneered in 1968 at RECKLI GmbH, Herne Germany. The inception of form liners began with fairly simple images for concrete, including cut-out shapes and silhouettes resting on a background texture. As time passed, these designs grew in complexity, and creative artists and sculptors began to work with form liner manufactures to produce and design anything imaginable in concrete walls, and on a grand scale.

Form liner textures were popularized in the early 1970s with graphic inlays. In 1972, Scott System created a fluted form liner with graphic inlays of shrimp boats, a famous crawfish wrapped around an oil bearing, tug boats and race boats. This sound/retaining wall, located in Morgan City, LA, was to be the first use ever of graphic inlays in form liner.

First use of form liner with graphic inlays in Morgan City, LA, 1972.

Tug boats and colorful oil rigs are inlaid graphics cast in concrete using form liner.
