= Euclidean planes in three-dimensional space =

Flat surface

Plane equation in normal form

In Euclidean geometry, a plane is a flat two-dimensional surface that extends indefinitely. Euclidean planes often arise as subspaces of three-dimensional space $\mathbb{R}^3$. A prototypical example is one of a room's walls, infinitely extended and assumed infinitesimally thin. While a pair of real numbers $\mathbb{R}^2$ suffices to describe points on a plane, the relationship with out-of-plane points requires special consideration for their embedding in the ambient space $\mathbb{R}^3$.

== Derived concepts ==
An oriented plane can be defined by two non-parallel vectors, a and b, that span the plane. The vector a × b is a normal to the plane (there are two normals, one on each side – the right-hand rule will determine which), and is a pseudovector. The surface orientation has consequences in computer graphics, where it has to be considered when transforming surface normals.

A plane segment or planar region (or simply "plane", in lay use) is a planar surface region; it is analogous to a line segment. A bivector is an oriented plane segment, analogous to directed line segments. (Note: More precisely, an algebraic entity analogous to an equivalence class of oriented plane segments.) A face is a plane segment bounding a solid object. A slab is a region bounded by two parallel planes. A parallelepiped is a region bounded by three pairs of parallel planes.

== Background ==
Euclid set forth the first great landmark of mathematical thought, an axiomatic treatment of geometry. He selected a small core of undefined terms (called common notions) and postulates (or axioms) which he then used to prove various geometrical statements. Although the plane in its modern sense is not directly given a definition anywhere in the Elements, it may be thought of as part of the common notions. Euclid never used numbers to measure length, angle, or area. The Euclidean plane equipped with a chosen Cartesian coordinate system is called a Cartesian plane; a non-Cartesian Euclidean plane equipped with a polar coordinate system would be called a polar plane.

Three parallel planes

A plane is a ruled surface.

=== Euclidean plane ===
Bi-dimensional Cartesian coordinate system

In mathematics, a Euclidean plane is a Euclidean space of dimension two, denoted $\textbf{E}^2$ or $\mathbb{E}^2$. It is a geometric space in which two real numbers are required to determine the position of each point. It is an affine space, which includes in particular the concept of parallel lines. It has also metrical properties induced by a distance, which allows to define circles, and angle measurement.

A Euclidean plane with a chosen Cartesian coordinate system is called a Cartesian plane. The set $\mathbb{R}^2$ of the ordered pairs of real numbers (the real coordinate plane), equipped with the dot product, is often called the Euclidean plane or standard Euclidean plane, since every Euclidean plane is isomorphic to it.

== Representation ==
This section is solely concerned with planes embedded in three dimensions: specifically, in R^{3}.

=== Determination by contained points and lines ===
In a Euclidean space of any number of dimensions, a plane is uniquely determined by any of the following:

- Three non-collinear points (points not on a single line).
- A line and a point not on that line.
- Two distinct but intersecting lines.
- Two distinct but parallel lines.

=== Properties ===
The following statements hold in three-dimensional Euclidean space but not in higher dimensions, though they have higher-dimensional analogues:

- Two distinct planes are either parallel or they intersect in a line.
- A line is either parallel to a plane, intersects it at a single point, or is contained in the plane.
- Two distinct lines perpendicular to the same plane must be parallel to each other.
- Two distinct planes perpendicular to the same line must be parallel to each other.

=== Point–normal form and general form of the equation of a plane ===
In a manner analogous to the way lines in a two-dimensional space are described using a point-slope form for their equations, planes in a three dimensional space have a natural description using a point in the plane and a vector orthogonal to it (the normal vector) to indicate its "inclination".

Specifically, let r_{0} be the position vector of some point P_{0} = (x_{0}, y_{0}, z_{0}), and let n = (a, b, c) be a nonzero vector. The plane determined by the point P_{0} and the vector n consists of those points P, with position vector r, such that the vector drawn from P_{0} to P is perpendicular to n. Recalling that two vectors are perpendicular if and only if their dot product is zero, it follows that the desired plane can be described as the set of all points r such that
$$\boldsymbol{n} \cdot (\boldsymbol{r}-\boldsymbol{r}_0)=0.$$
The dot here means a dot (scalar) product.
Expanded this becomes
$$a (x-x_0) + b(y-y_0) + c(z-z_0) = 0,$$
which is the point–normal form of the equation of a plane. This is just a linear equation
$$ax + by + cz + d = 0,$$
where
$$d = -(ax_0 + by_0 + cz_0),$$
which is the expanded form of $- \boldsymbol{n} \cdot \boldsymbol{r}_0.$

In mathematics it is a common convention to express the normal as a unit vector, but the above argument holds for a normal vector of any non-zero length.

Conversely, it is easily shown that if a, b, c, and d are constants and a, b, and c are not all zero, then the graph of the equation
$$ax + by + cz + d = 0,$$
is a plane having the vector n = (a, b, c) as a normal. This familiar equation for a plane is called the general form of the equation of the plane or just the plane equation.

Thus for example a regression equation of the form y = d + ax + cz (with b = −1) establishes a best-fit plane in three-dimensional space when there are two explanatory variables.

=== Describing a plane with a point and two vectors lying on it ===
Alternatively, a plane may be described parametrically as the set of all points of the form
$$\boldsymbol{r} = \boldsymbol{r}_0 + s \boldsymbol{v} + t \boldsymbol{w},$$

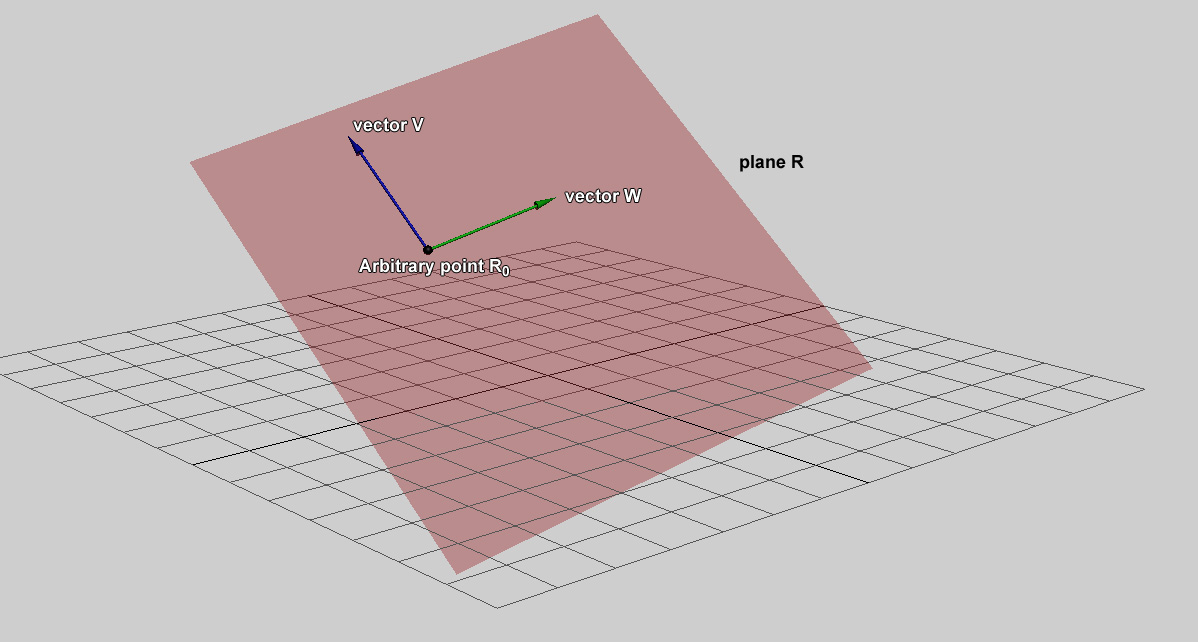
Vector description of a plane

where s and t range over all real numbers, v and w are given linearly independent vectors defining the plane, and r_{0} is the vector representing the position of an arbitrary (but fixed) point on the plane. The vectors v and w can be visualized as vectors starting at r_{0} and pointing in different directions along the plane. The vectors v and w can be perpendicular, but cannot be parallel.

=== Describing a plane through three points ===
Let p_{1} = (x_{1}, y_{1}, z_{1}), p_{2} = (x_{2}, y_{2}, z_{2}), and p_{3} = (x_{3}, y_{3}, z_{3}) be non-collinear points.

==== Method 1 ====
The plane passing through p_{1}, p_{2}, and p_{3} can be described as the set of all points (x,y,z) that satisfy the following determinant equations:
$$\begin{vmatrix}
x - x_1 & y - y_1 & z - z_1 \\
x_2 - x_1 & y_2 - y_1 & z_2 - z_1 \\
x_3 - x_1 & y_3 - y_1 & z_3 - z_1
\end{vmatrix} = \begin{vmatrix}
x - x_1 & y - y_1 & z - z_1 \\
x - x_2 & y - y_2 & z - z_2 \\
x - x_3 & y - y_3 & z - z_3
\end{vmatrix} = 0.$$

==== Method 2 ====
To describe the plane by an equation of the form $ax + by + cz + d = 0$, solve the following system of equations:
$$ax_1 + by_1 + cz_1 + d = 0$$
$$ax_2 + by_2 + cz_2 + d = 0$$
$$ax_3 + by_3 + cz_3 + d = 0.$$

This system can be solved using Cramer's rule and basic matrix manipulations. Let
$$D = \begin{vmatrix}
x_1 & y_1 & z_1 \\
x_2 & y_2 & z_2 \\
x_3 & y_3 & z_3
\end{vmatrix}.$$

If D is non-zero (so for planes not through the origin) the values for a, b and c can be calculated as follows:
$$a = \frac{-d}{D} \begin{vmatrix}
1 & y_1 & z_1 \\
1 & y_2 & z_2 \\
1 & y_3 & z_3
\end{vmatrix}$$
$$b = \frac{-d}{D} \begin{vmatrix}
x_1 & 1 & z_1 \\
x_2 & 1 & z_2 \\
x_3 & 1 & z_3
\end{vmatrix}$$
$$c = \frac{-d}{D} \begin{vmatrix}
x_1 & y_1 & 1 \\
x_2 & y_2 & 1 \\
x_3 & y_3 & 1
\end{vmatrix}.$$

These equations are parametric in d. Setting d equal to any non-zero number and substituting it into these equations will yield one solution set.

==== Method 3 ====
This plane can also be described by the § Point–normal form and general form of the equation of a plane prescription above. A suitable normal vector is given by the cross product
$$\boldsymbol n = ( \boldsymbol p_2 - \boldsymbol p_1 ) \times ( \boldsymbol p_3 - \boldsymbol p_1 ),$$
and the point r_{0} can be taken to be any of the given points p_{1}, p_{2} or p_{3} (or any other point in the plane).

== Operations ==
=== Distance from a point to a plane ===
In Euclidean space, the distance from a point to a plane is the distance between a given point and its orthogonal projection on the plane, the perpendicular distance to the nearest point on the plane.

It can be found starting with a change of variables that moves the origin to coincide with the given point then finding the point on the shifted plane $ax + by + cz = d$ that is closest to the origin. The resulting point has Cartesian coordinates $(x,y,z)$:

$$\displaystyle x = \frac {ad}{{a^2+b^2+c^2}}, \quad \quad \displaystyle y = \frac {bd}{{a^2+b^2+c^2}}, \quad \quad \displaystyle z = \frac {cd}{{a^2+b^2+c^2}}$$.

The distance between the origin and the point $(x,y,z)$ is $\sqrt{x^2+y^2+z^2}$.

=== Line–plane intersection ===
The three possible plane-line relationships in three dimensions (Shown in each case is only a portion of the plane, which extends infinitely far.)

In geometry, the intersection of a line and a plane in three-dimensional space can be the empty set, a point, or the line itself. It is the entire line if that line is embedded in the plane, and is the empty set if the line is parallel to the plane but outside it. Otherwise, the line cuts through the plane at a single point.

Distinguishing these cases, and determining equations for the point and line in the latter cases, have use in computer graphics, motion planning, and collision detection.

=== Line of intersection between two planes ===
Two intersecting planes in three-dimensional space

In geometry, the intersection of two Euclidean planes in three-dimensional space is a line or the empty set for parallel planes.

=== Sphere–plane intersection ===
When the intersection of a sphere and a plane is not empty or a single point, it is a circle. This can be seen as follows:

Let S be a sphere with center O, P a plane which intersects S. Draw O̅E̅ perpendicular to P and meeting P at E. Let A and B be any two different points in the intersection. Then AOE and BOE are right triangles with a common side, OE, and hypotenuses AO and BO equal. Therefore, the remaining sides AE and BE are equal. This proves that all points in the intersection are the same distance from the point E in the plane P, in other words all points in the intersection lie on a circle C with center E. This proves that the intersection of P and S is contained in C. Note that OE is the axis of the circle.

Now consider a point D of the circle C. Since C lies in P, so does D. On the other hand, the triangles AOE and DOE are right triangles with a common side, OE, and legs EA and ED equal. Therefore, the hypotenuses AO and DO are equal, and equal to the radius of S, so that D lies in S. This proves that C is contained in the intersection of P and S.

As a corollary, on a sphere there is exactly one circle that can be drawn through three given points.

The proof can be extended to show that the points on a circle are all a common angular distance from one of its poles.

Compare also conic sections, which can produce ovals.

== Occurrence in nature ==
The wavefronts of a plane wave traveling in 3-space

A plane serves as a mathematical model for many physical phenomena, such as specular reflection in a plane mirror or wavefronts in a traveling plane wave. The free surface of undisturbed liquids tends to be nearly flat (see flatness). The flattest surface ever manufactured is a quantum-stabilized atom mirror. In astronomy, various reference planes are used to define positions in orbit. Anatomical planes may be lateral ("sagittal"), frontal ("coronal") or transversal. In geology, beds (layers of sediments) often are planar. Planes are involved in different forms of imaging, such as the focal plane, picture plane, and image plane.

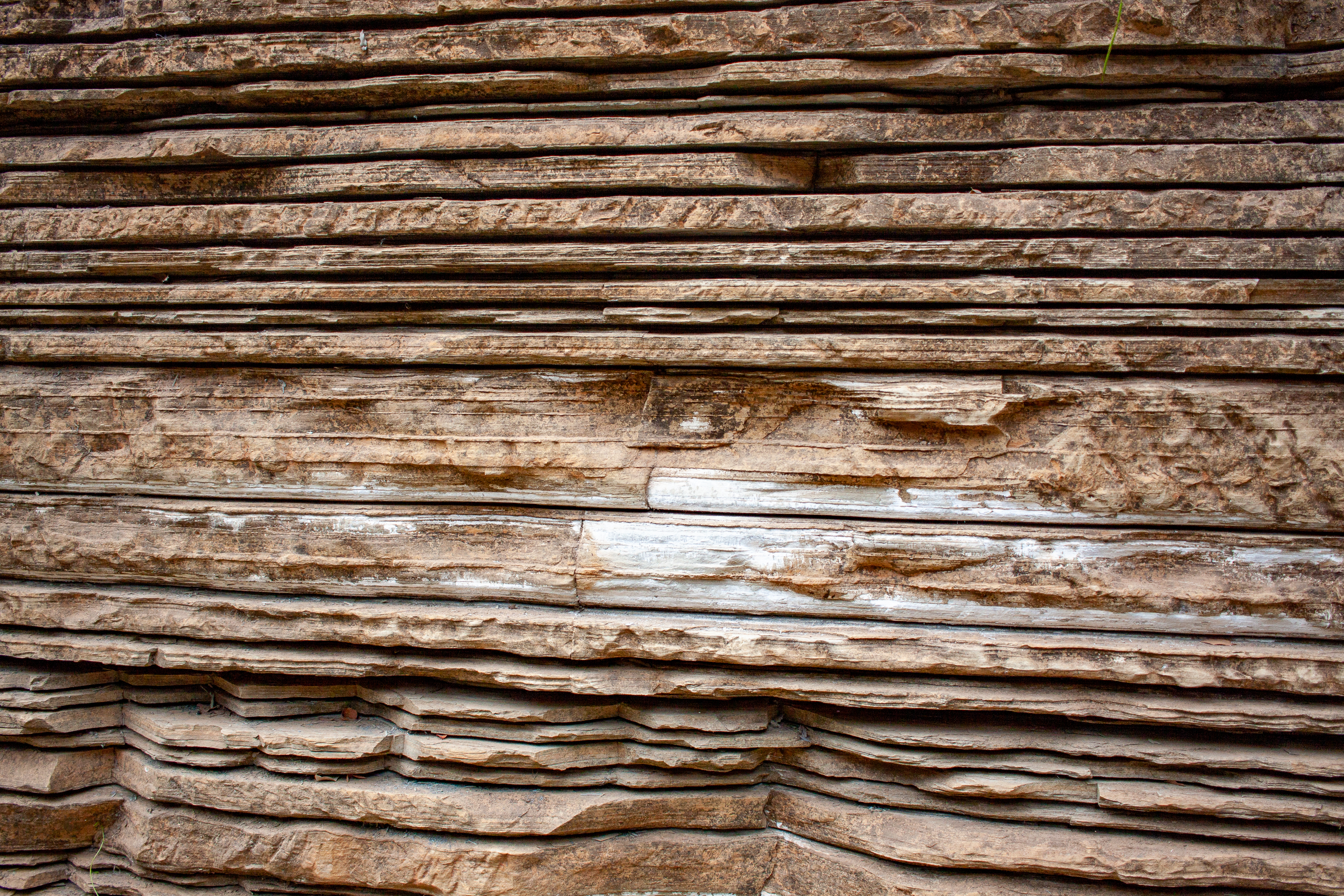
Beds of sedimentary rock at Parque Geológico do Varvito, Itu, São Paulo, Brazil

=== Miller indices ===
Planes with different Miller indices in cubic crystals

The attitude of a lattice plane is the orientation of the line normal to the plane, and is described by the plane's Miller indices. In three-space a family of planes (a series of parallel planes) can be denoted by its Miller indices (hkl), so the family of planes has an attitude common to all its constituent planes.

=== Strike and dip ===
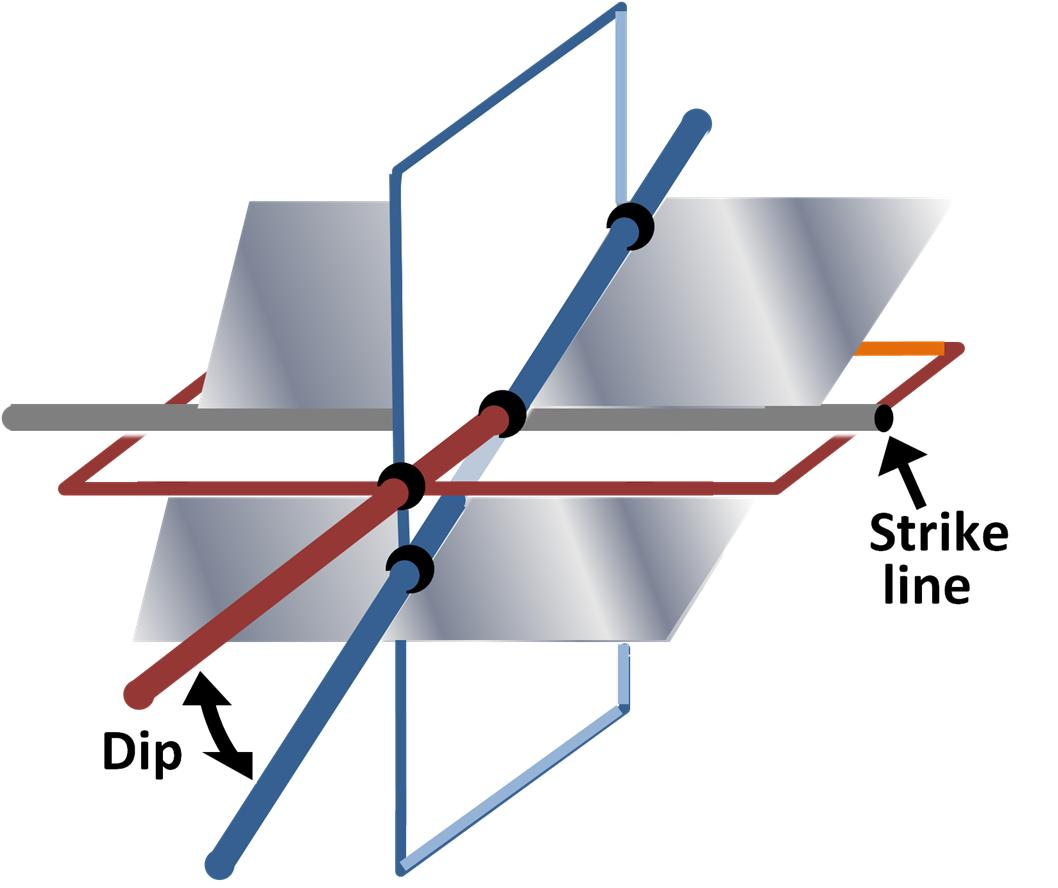
Strike line and dip of a plane describing attitude relative to a horizontal plane and a vertical plane perpendicular to the strike line

Many features observed in geology are planes or lines, and their orientation is commonly referred to as their attitude. These attitudes are specified with two angles.

For a line, these angles are called the trend and the plunge. The trend is the compass direction of the line, and the plunge is the downward angle it makes with a horizontal plane.

For a plane, the two angles are called its strike (angle) and its dip (angle). A strike line is the intersection of a horizontal plane with the observed planar feature (and therefore a horizontal line), and the strike angle is the bearing of this line (that is, relative to geographic north or from magnetic north). The dip is the angle between a horizontal plane and the observed planar feature as observed in a third vertical plane perpendicular to the strike line.

== See also ==
- Dihedral angle
- Flat (geometry)
- Half-plane
- Image plane
- Hyperplane
- Plane coordinates
- Plane of incidence
- Plane of rotation
- Plane orientation
- Polygon
- Quadrant (plane geometry)
