= Perpendicular distance =

Distance from one geometric object to another along a line perpendicular to both

In geometry, the perpendicular distance between two objects is the distance from one to the other, measured along a line that is perpendicular to one or both.

The distance from a point to a line is the distance to the nearest point on that line. That is the point at which a segment from it to the given point is perpendicular to the line.

Likewise, the distance from a point to a curve is measured by a line segment that is perpendicular to a tangent line to the curve at the nearest point on the curve.

The distance from a point to a plane is measured as the length from the point along a segment that is perpendicular to the plane, meaning that it is perpendicular to all lines in the plane that pass through the nearest point in the plane to the given point.

Other instances include:

- Point on plane closest to origin, for the perpendicular distance from the origin to a plane in three-dimensional space
- Nearest distance between skew lines, for the perpendicular distance between two non-parallel lines in three-dimensional space

Perpendicular regression fits a line to data points by minimizing the sum of squared perpendicular distances from the data points to the line. Other geometric curve fitting methods using perpendicular distance to measure the quality of a fit exist, as in total least squares.

The concept of perpendicular distance may be generalized to

- orthogonal distance, between more abstract non-geometric orthogonal objects, as in linear algebra (e.g., principal components analysis);
- normal distance, involving a surface normal, between an arbitrary point and its foot on the surface. It can be used for surface fitting and for defining offset surfaces.

== See also ==
- Distance between sets
- Hypercycle (geometry)
- Moment of inertia
- Signed distance
