= Perpendicular =

Relationship between two lines that meet at a right angle

The segment AB is perpendicular to the segment CD because the two angles it creates (indicated in orange and blue) are each 90 degrees. The segment AB can be called the perpendicular from A to the segment CD, using "perpendicular" as a noun. The point B is called the foot of the perpendicular from A to segment CD, or simply, the foot of A on CD.

In geometry, two geometric objects are perpendicular if they intersect at right angles, i.e. at an angle of 90 degrees or π/2 radians. The condition of perpendicularity may be represented graphically using the perpendicular symbol, ⟂. Perpendicular intersections can happen between two lines (or two line segments), between a line and a plane, and between two planes.

Perpendicular is also used as a noun: a perpendicular is a line which is perpendicular to a given line or plane.

Perpendicularity is one particular instance of the more general mathematical concept of orthogonality; perpendicularity is the orthogonality of classical geometric objects. Thus, in advanced mathematics, the word "perpendicular" is sometimes used to describe much more complicated geometric orthogonality conditions, such as that between a surface and its normal vector.

A line is said to be perpendicular to another line if the two lines intersect at a right angle. Explicitly, a first line is perpendicular to a second line if (1) the two lines meet; and (2) at the point of intersection the straight angle on one side of the first line is cut by the second line into two congruent angles. Perpendicularity can be shown to be symmetric, meaning if a first line is perpendicular to a second line, then the second line is also perpendicular to the first. For this reason, we may speak of two lines as being perpendicular (to each other) without specifying an order. A great example of perpendicularity can be seen in any compass, note the cardinal points; North, East, South, West (NESW) The line N-S is perpendicular to the line W-E and the angles N-E, E-S, S-W and W-N are all 90° to one another.

Perpendicularity easily extends to segments and rays. For example, a line segment $\overline{AB}$ is perpendicular to a line segment $\overline{CD}$ if, when each is extended in both directions to form an infinite line, these two resulting lines are perpendicular in the sense above. In symbols, $\overline{AB} \perp \overline{CD}$ means line segment AB is perpendicular to line segment CD.

A line is said to be perpendicular to a plane if it is perpendicular to every line in the plane that it intersects. This definition depends on the definition of perpendicularity between lines.

Two planes in space are said to be perpendicular if the dihedral angle at which they meet is a right angle.

== Foot of a perpendicular ==
The word foot is frequently used in connection with perpendiculars. This usage is exemplified in the top diagram, above, and its caption. The diagram can be in any orientation. The foot is not necessarily at the bottom.

More precisely, let A be a point and m a line. If B is the point of intersection of m and the unique line through A that is perpendicular to m, then B is called the foot of this perpendicular through A.

== Construction of the perpendicular ==
Construction of the perpendicular (blue) to the line AB through the point P

Construction of the perpendicular to the half-line h from the point P (applicable not only at the end point A, M is freely selectable), animation at the end with pause 10 s

To make the perpendicular to the line AB through the point P using compass-and-straightedge construction, proceed as follows (see figure left):

- Step 1 (red): construct a circle with center at P to create points A' and B' on the line AB, which are equidistant from P.
- Step 2 (green): construct circles centered at A' and B' having equal radius. Let Q and P be the points of intersection of these two circles.
- Step 3 (blue): connect Q and P to construct the desired perpendicular PQ.

To prove that the PQ is perpendicular to AB, use the SSS congruence theorem for QPA' and QPB' to conclude that angles OPA' and OPB' are equal. Then use the SAS congruence theorem for triangles OPA' and OPB' to conclude that angles POA and POB are equal. See also Radical axis.

To make the perpendicular to the line g at or through the point P using Thales's theorem, see the animation at right.

The Pythagorean theorem can be used as the basis of methods of constructing right angles. For example, by counting links, three pieces of chain can be made with lengths in the ratio 3:4:5. These can be laid out to form a triangle, which will have a right angle opposite its longest side. This method is useful for laying out gardens and fields, where the dimensions are large, and great accuracy is not needed. The chains can be used repeatedly whenever required.

== In relationship to parallel lines ==
The arrowhead marks indicate that the lines a and b, cut by the transversal line c, are parallel.

If two lines (a and b) are both perpendicular to a third line (c), all of the angles formed along the third line are right angles. Therefore, in Euclidean geometry, any two lines that are both perpendicular to a third line are parallel to each other, because of the parallel postulate. Conversely, if one line is perpendicular to a second line, it is also perpendicular to any line parallel to that second line.

In the figure at the right, all of the orange-shaded angles are congruent to each other and all of the green-shaded angles are congruent to each other, because vertical angles are congruent and alternate interior angles formed by a transversal cutting parallel lines are congruent. Therefore, if lines a and b are parallel, any of the following conclusions leads to all of the others:

- One of the angles in the diagram is a right angle.
- One of the orange-shaded angles is congruent to one of the green-shaded angles.
- Line c is perpendicular to line a.
- Line c is perpendicular to line b.
- All four angles are equal.

== In computing distances ==
In geometry, the perpendicular distance between two objects is the distance from one to the other, measured along a line that is perpendicular to one or both.

The distance from a point to a line is the distance to the nearest point on that line. That is the point at which a segment from it to the given point is perpendicular to the line.

Likewise, the distance from a point to a curve is measured by a line segment that is perpendicular to a tangent line to the curve at the nearest point on the curve.

The distance from a point to a plane is measured as the length from the point along a segment that is perpendicular to the plane, meaning that it is perpendicular to all lines in the plane that pass through the nearest point in the plane to the given point.

Other instances include:

- Point on plane closest to origin, for the perpendicular distance from the origin to a plane in three-dimensional space
- Nearest distance between skew lines, for the perpendicular distance between two non-parallel lines in three-dimensional space

Perpendicular regression fits a line to data points by minimizing the sum of squared perpendicular distances from the data points to the line. Other geometric curve fitting methods using perpendicular distance to measure the quality of a fit exist, as in total least squares.

The concept of perpendicular distance may be generalized to

- orthogonal distance, between more abstract non-geometric orthogonal objects, as in linear algebra (e.g., principal components analysis);
- normal distance, involving a surface normal, between an arbitrary point and its foot on the surface. It can be used for surface fitting and for defining offset surfaces.

== Graph of functions ==
Two perpendicular lines have slopes m_{1} = Δy_{1}/Δx_{1} and m_{2} = Δy_{2}/Δx_{2} satisfying the relationship m_{1}m_{2} = −1.

In the two-dimensional plane, right angles can be formed by two intersected lines if the product of their slopes equals −1. Thus for two linear functions $y_1(x) = m_1 x + b_1$ and $y_2(x) = m_2 x + b_2$, the graphs of the functions will be perpendicular if $m_1 m_2 = -1.$

The dot product of vectors can be also used to obtain the same result: First, shift coordinates so that the origin is situated where the lines cross. Then define two displacements along each line, $\vec r_j$, for $(j=1,2).$ Now, use the fact that the inner product vanishes for perpendicular vectors:

$$\vec r_1=x_1\hat x + y_1\hat y =x_1\hat x + m_1x_1\hat y$$
$$\vec r_2=x_2\hat x + y_2\hat y = x_2\hat x + m_2x_2\hat y$$
$$\vec r_1 \cdot \vec r_2 = \left(1+m_1m_2\right)x_1x_2 =0$$
$\therefore m_1m_2=-1$ (unless $x_1$ or $x_2$ vanishes.)

Both proofs are valid for horizontal and vertical lines to the extent that we can let one slope be $\varepsilon$, and take the limit that $\varepsilon\rightarrow 0.$ If one slope goes to zero, the other goes to infinity.

== In circles and other conics ==
=== Circles ===
Each diameter of a circle is perpendicular to the tangent line to that circle at the point where the diameter intersects the circle.

A line segment through a circle's center bisecting a chord is perpendicular to the chord.

If the intersection of any two perpendicular chords divides one chord into lengths a and b and divides the other chord into lengths c and d, then a^{2} + b^{2} + c^{2} + d^{2} equals the square of the diameter.

The sum of the squared lengths of any two perpendicular chords intersecting at a given point is the same as that of any other two perpendicular chords intersecting at the same point, and is given by 8r^{2} – 4p^{2} (where r is the circle's radius and p is the distance from the center point to the point of intersection).

Thales' theorem states that two lines both through the same point on a circle but going through opposite endpoints of a diameter are perpendicular. This is equivalent to saying that any diameter of a circle subtends a right angle at any point on the circle, except the two endpoints of the diameter.

=== Ellipses ===
The major and minor axes of an ellipse are perpendicular to each other and to the tangent lines to the ellipse at the points where the axes intersect the ellipse.

The major axis of an ellipse is perpendicular to the directrix and to each latus rectum.

=== Parabolas ===
In a parabola, the axis of symmetry is perpendicular to each of the latus rectum, the directrix, and the tangent line at the point where the axis intersects the parabola.

From a point on the tangent line to a parabola's vertex, the other tangent line to the parabola is perpendicular to the line from that point through the parabola's focus.

The orthoptic property of a parabola is that If two tangents to the parabola are perpendicular to each other, then they intersect on the directrix. Conversely, two tangents which intersect on the directrix are perpendicular. This implies that, seen from any point on its directrix, any parabola subtends a right angle.

=== Hyperbolas ===
The transverse axis of a hyperbola is perpendicular to the conjugate axis and to each directrix.

The product of the perpendicular distances from a point P on a hyperbola or on its conjugate hyperbola to the asymptotes is a constant independent of the location of P.

A rectangular hyperbola has asymptotes that are perpendicular to each other. It has an eccentricity equal to $\sqrt{2}.$

== In polygons ==
=== Triangles ===
The legs of a right triangle are perpendicular to each other.

The altitudes of a triangle are perpendicular to their respective bases. The perpendicular bisectors of the sides also play a prominent role in triangle geometry.

The Euler line of an isosceles triangle is perpendicular to the triangle's base.

The Droz-Farny line theorem concerns a property of two perpendicular lines intersecting at a triangle's orthocenter.

Harcourt's theorem concerns the relationship of line segments through a vertex and perpendicular to any line tangent to the triangle's incircle.

=== Quadrilaterals ===
In a square or other rectangle, all pairs of adjacent sides are perpendicular. A right trapezoid is a trapezoid that has two pairs of adjacent sides that are perpendicular.

Each of the four maltitudes of a quadrilateral is a perpendicular to a side through the midpoint of the opposite side.

An orthodiagonal quadrilateral is a quadrilateral whose diagonals are perpendicular. These include the square, the rhombus, and the kite. By Brahmagupta's theorem, in an orthodiagonal quadrilateral that is also cyclic, a line through the midpoint of one side and through the intersection point of the diagonals is perpendicular to the opposite side.

By van Aubel's theorem, if squares are constructed externally on the sides of a quadrilateral, the line segments connecting the centers of opposite squares are perpendicular and equal in length.

== Lines in three dimensions ==
Up to three lines in three-dimensional space can be pairwise perpendicular, as exemplified by the x, y, and z axes of a three-dimensional Cartesian coordinate system.

== See also ==
- Orthogonal projection
- Tangential and normal components
