= Flat (geometry) =

Affine subspace of a Euclidean space

In geometry, a flat is an affine subspace, i.e. a subset of an affine space that is itself an affine space. Particularly, in the case the parent space is Euclidean, a flat is a Euclidean subspace which inherits the notion of distance from its parent space.

In an n-dimensional space, there are k-flats of every dimension k from 0 to n; flats one dimension lower than the parent space, (n − 1)-flats, are called hyperplanes.

The flats in a plane (two-dimensional space) are points, lines, and the plane itself; the flats in three-dimensional space are points, lines, planes, and the space itself. The definition of flat excludes non-straight curves and non-planar surfaces, which are subspaces having different notions of distance: arc length and geodesic length, respectively.

Flats occur in linear algebra, as geometric realizations of solution sets of systems of linear equations.

A flat is a manifold and an algebraic variety, and is sometimes called a linear manifold or linear variety to distinguish it from other manifolds or varieties.

== Descriptions ==
=== By equations ===
A flat can be described by a system of linear equations. For example, a line in two-dimensional space can be described by a single linear equation involving x and y:

$$3x + 5y = 8.$$

In three-dimensional space, a single linear equation involving x, y, and z defines a plane, while a pair of linear equations can be used to describe a line. In general, a linear equation in n variables describes a hyperplane, and a system of linear equations describes the intersection of those hyperplanes. Assuming the equations are consistent and linearly independent, a system of k equations describes a flat of dimension n − k.

=== Parametric ===
A flat can also be described by a system of linear parametric equations. A line can be described by equations involving one parameter:

$$x=2+3t,\;\;\;\;y=-1+t\;\;\;\;z=\frac{3}{2}-4t$$

while the description of a plane would require two parameters:

$$x=5+2t_1-3t_2,\;\;\;\; y=-4+t_1+2t_2\;\;\;\;z=5t_1-3t_2.\,\!$$

In general, a parameterization of a flat of dimension k would require k parameters, e.g. t_{1}, …, t_{k}.

== Operations and relations on flats ==
=== Intersecting, parallel, and skew flats ===
An intersection of flats is either a flat or the empty set.

If each line from one flat is parallel to some line from another flat, then these two flats are parallel. Two parallel flats of the same dimension either coincide or do not intersect; they can be described by two systems of linear equations which differ only in their right-hand sides.

If flats do not intersect, and no line from the first flat is parallel to a line from the second flat, then these are skew flats. It is possible only if sum of their dimensions is less than dimension of the ambient space.

=== Join ===
For two flats of dimensions k_{1} and k_{2} there exists the minimal flat which contains them, of dimension at most k_{1} + k_{2} + 1. If two flats intersect, then the dimension of the containing flat equals to k_{1} + k_{2} minus the dimension of the intersection.

=== Properties of operations ===
These two operations (referred to as meet and join) make the set of all flats in the Euclidean n-space a lattice and can build systematic coordinates for flats in any dimension, leading to Grassmann coordinates or dual Grassmann coordinates. For example, a line in three-dimensional space is determined by two distinct points or by two distinct planes.

However, the lattice of all flats is not a distributive lattice. If two lines ℓ_{1} and ℓ_{2} intersect, then ℓ_{1} ∩ ℓ_{2} is a point. If p is a point not lying on the same plane, then (ℓ_{1} ∩ ℓ_{2}) + p = (ℓ_{1} + p) ∩ (ℓ_{2} + p), both representing a line. But when ℓ_{1} and ℓ_{2} are parallel, this distributivity fails, giving p on the left-hand side and a third parallel line on the right-hand side.

== Euclidean geometry ==
The aforementioned facts do not depend on the structure being that of Euclidean space (namely, involving Euclidean distance) and are correct in any affine space. In a Euclidean space:

- There is the distance between a flat and a point. (See for example Distance from a point to a plane and Distance from a point to a line.)
- There is the distance between two flats, equal to 0 if they intersect. (See for example Distance between two parallel lines (in the same plane) and Skew lines § Distance.)
- There is the angle between two flats, which belongs to the interval [0, π/2] between 0 and the right angle. (See for example Dihedral angle (between two planes). See also Angles between flats.)

== See also ==
- Matroid
- Coplanarity
- Isometry
