= Sabine Van Huffel =

Belgian computer scientist

Sabine J. A. Van Huffel (born 26 September 1958) is a Belgian computer scientist, applied mathematician, and electrical engineer, whose research concerns computational methods for medical diagnostics, and in particular methods based on total least squares.

== Education and career ==
Van Huffel was born in Menen. She earned bachelor's and doctoral degrees from KU Leuven in 1981 and 1987, with Joos Vandewalle as her doctoral advisor. Her dissertation, Analysis of the Total Least Squares Problem and its use in parameter estimation, concerned total least squares methods for parameter estimation.

She is a full professor at KU Leuven since 2002. and a Distinguished Professor of Electrical Engineering at Eindhoven University of Technology (TU/e) since 2014 (until 2022).

== Book ==
With Vandewalle, Van Huffel is the author of the book The Total Least Squares Problem: Computational Aspects and Analysis (SIAM, 1991).

== Recognition ==
Van Huffel is a fellow of the IEEE and the recipient of an honorary doctorate from TU/e. In 2016 she was elected as a fellow of the Society for Industrial and Applied Mathematics "for esteemed accomplishments in bridging the gap between advanced numerical linear algebra techniques and biomedical signal processing". She was elected to the Royal Flemish Academy of Belgium for Science and the Arts in 2017.
