= Transformation geometry =

Branch of mathematics concerned with the movement of shapes and sets

A reflection against an axis followed by a reflection against a second axis parallel to the first one results in a total motion that is a translation.

A reflection against an axis followed by a reflection against a second axis not parallel to the first one results in a total motion that is a rotation around the point of intersection of the axes.

In mathematics, transformation geometry (or transformational geometry) is the name of a mathematical and pedagogic take on the study of geometry by focusing on groups of geometric transformations, and properties that are invariant under them. It is opposed to the classical synthetic geometry approach of Euclidean geometry, which focuses on proving theorems.

For example, within transformation geometry, the properties of an isosceles triangle are deduced from the fact that it is mapped to itself by a reflection about a certain line. This contrasts with the classical proofs by the criteria for congruence of triangles.

The first systematic effort to use transformations as the foundation of geometry was made by Felix Klein in the 19th century, under the name Erlangen programme. For nearly a century, this approach remained confined to mathematics research circles. In the 20th century, efforts were made to exploit it for mathematical education. Andrei Kolmogorov included this approach (together with set theory) as part of a proposal for geometry teaching reform in Russia. These efforts culminated in the 1960s with the general reform of mathematics teaching known as the New Math movement.

== Use in mathematics teaching ==
An exploration of transformation geometry often begins with a study of reflection symmetry as found in daily life. The first real transformation is reflection in a line or reflection against an axis. The composition of two reflections results in a rotation when the lines intersect, or a translation when they are parallel. Thus, through transformations, students learn about Euclidean plane isometry. For instance, consider reflection in a vertical line and a line inclined at 45° to the horizontal. One can observe that one composition yields a counter-clockwise quarter-turn (90°) while the reverse composition yields a clockwise quarter-turn. Such results show that transformation geometry includes non-commutative processes.

An entertaining application of reflection in a line occurs in a proof of the one-seventh area triangle found in any triangle.

Another transformation introduced to young students is the dilation. However, the reflection in a circle transformation seems inappropriate for lower grades. Thus, inversive geometry, a larger study than grade school transformation geometry, is usually reserved for college students.

Experiments with concrete symmetry groups make way for abstract group theory. Other concrete activities use computations with complex numbers, hypercomplex numbers, or matrices to express transformation geometry. Such transformation geometry lessons present an alternate view that contrasts with classical synthetic geometry. When students then encounter analytic geometry, the ideas of coordinate rotations and reflections follow easily. All these concepts prepare for linear algebra, where the reflection concept is expanded.

Educators have shown some interest and described projects and experiences with transformation geometry for children from kindergarten to high school. In the case of very young age children, to avoid introducing new terminology and to make links with students' everyday experience with concrete objects, it was sometimes recommended to use words they are familiar with, like "flips" for line reflections, "slides" for translations, and "turns" for rotations, although these are not precise mathematical language. In some proposals, students start by performing with concrete objects before they perform the abstract transformations via their definitions of a mapping of each point of the figure.

In an attempt to restructure the courses of geometry in Russia, Kolmogorov suggested presenting it from the point of view of transformations, so the geometry courses were structured based on set theory. This led to the appearance of the term "congruent" in schools, for figures that were before called "equal": since a figure was seen as a set of points, it could only be equal to itself, and two triangles that could be overlapped by isometries were said to be congruent.

One author expressed the importance of group theory to transformation geometry as follows:

I have gone to some trouble to develop from first principles all the group theory that I need, with the intention that my book can serve as a first introduction to transformation groups, and the notions of abstract group theory if you have never seen these.

== See also ==
- Chirality (mathematics)
- Geometric transformation
- Euler's rotation theorem
- Motion (geometry)
- Transformation matrix
