= Hyperplane =

Subspace of n-space whose dimension is (n-1)

Two intersecting planes: Two-dimensional planes are the hyperplanes in three-dimensional space.

In geometry, a hyperplane is a generalization of a two-dimensional plane in three-dimensional space to mathematical spaces of arbitrary dimension. Like a plane in space, a hyperplane is a flat hypersurface, a subspace whose dimension is one less than that of the ambient space. Two lower-dimensional examples of hyperplanes are one-dimensional lines in a plane and zero-dimensional points on a line.

Most commonly, the ambient space is n-dimensional Euclidean space, in which case the hyperplanes are the (n − 1)-dimensional "flats", each of which separates the space into two half spaces. A reflection across a hyperplane is a kind of motion (geometric transformation preserving distance between points), and the group of all motions is generated by the reflections. A convex polytope is the intersection of half-spaces.

In non-Euclidean geometry, the ambient space might be the n-dimensional sphere or hyperbolic space, or more generally a pseudo-Riemannian space form, and the hyperplanes are the hypersurfaces consisting of all geodesics through a point which are perpendicular to a specific normal geodesic.

In other kinds of ambient spaces, some properties from Euclidean space are no longer relevant. For example, in affine space, there is no concept of distance, so there are no reflections or motions. In a non-orientable space such as elliptic space or projective space, there is no concept of half-planes. In greatest generality, the notion of hyperplane is meaningful in any mathematical space in which the concept of the dimension of a subspace is defined (see also Matroid § Hyperplanes (coatoms).

The difference in dimension between a subspace and its ambient space is known as its codimension. A hyperplane has codimension 1.

== Technical description ==
In geometry, a hyperplane of an n-dimensional space V is a subspace of dimension n − 1, or equivalently, of codimension 1 in V. The space V may be a Euclidean space or more generally an affine space, or a vector space or a projective space, and the notion of hyperplane varies correspondingly since the definition of subspace differs in these settings; in all cases however, any hyperplane can be given in coordinates as the solution of a single (due to the "codimension 1" constraint) algebraic equation of degree 1.

If V is a vector space, one distinguishes "vector hyperplanes" (which are linear subspaces, and therefore must pass through the origin) and "affine hyperplanes" (which need not pass through the origin; they can be obtained by translation of a vector hyperplane). A hyperplane in a Euclidean space separates that space into two half spaces, and defines a reflection that fixes the hyperplane and interchanges those two half spaces.

== Special types of hyperplanes ==
Several specific types of hyperplanes are defined with properties that are well suited for particular purposes. Some of these specializations are described here.

=== Affine hyperplanes ===
An affine hyperplane is an affine subspace of codimension 1 in an affine space. In Cartesian coordinates, such a hyperplane can be described with a single linear equation of the following form (where at least one of the $a_i$s is non-zero and $b$ is an arbitrary constant):

$$a_1x_1 + a_2x_2  + \cdots + a_nx_n = b.\$$

In the case of a real affine space, in other words when the coordinates are real numbers, this affine space separates the space into two half-spaces, which are the connected components of the complement of the hyperplane, and are given by the inequalities
$$a_1x_1 + a_2x_2  + \cdots + a_nx_n < b\$$
and
$$a_1x_1 + a_2x_2  + \cdots + a_nx_n > b.\$$

As an example, a point is a hyperplane in 1-dimensional space, a line is a hyperplane in 2-dimensional space, and a plane is a hyperplane in 3-dimensional space. A line in 3-dimensional space is not a hyperplane, and does not separate the space into two parts (the complement of such a line is connected).

Any hyperplane of a Euclidean space has exactly two unit normal vectors: $\pm\hat{n}$. In particular, if we consider $\mathbb{R}^{n+1}$ equipped with the conventional inner product (dot product), then one can define the affine subspace with normal vector $\hat{n}$ and origin translation $\tilde{b} \in \mathbb{R}^{n+1}$ as the set of all $x \in \mathbb{R}^{n+1}$ such that $\hat{n} \cdot (x-\tilde{b})=0$.

Affine hyperplanes are used to define decision boundaries in many machine learning algorithms such as linear-combination (oblique) decision trees, and perceptrons.

=== Vector hyperplanes ===
In a vector space, a vector hyperplane is a linear subspace of codimension 1, only possibly shifted from the origin by a vector, in which case it is referred to as a flat. Such a hyperplane is the solution of a single linear equation.

=== Projective hyperplanes ===
Projective hyperplanes are used in projective geometry. A projective subspace is a set of points with the property that for any two points of the set, all the points on the line determined by the two points are contained in the set. Projective geometry can be viewed as affine geometry with vanishing points (points at infinity) added. An affine hyperplane together with the associated points at infinity forms a projective hyperplane. One special case of a projective hyperplane is the infinite or ideal hyperplane, which is defined with the set of all points at infinity.

In projective space, a hyperplane does not divide the space into two parts; rather, it takes two hyperplanes to separate points and divide up the space. The reason for this is that the space essentially "wraps around" so that both sides of a lone hyperplane are connected to each other.

== Applications ==
In convex geometry, two disjoint convex sets in n-dimensional Euclidean space are separated by a hyperplane, a result called the hyperplane separation theorem.

In machine learning, hyperplanes are a key tool to create support vector machines for such tasks as computer vision and natural language processing.

In multiple linear regression with more than two regressors, the datapoint and its predicted value via a linear model is a hyperplane.

In astronomy, hyperplanes can be used to calculate shortest distance between star systems, galaxies and celestial bodies with regard of general relativity and curvature of space-time as optimized geodesic or paths influenced by gravitational fields.

== Dihedral angles ==
The dihedral angle between two non-parallel hyperplanes of a Euclidean space is the angle between the corresponding normal vectors. The product of the transformations in the two hyperplanes is a rotation whose axis is the subspace of codimension 2 obtained by intersecting the hyperplanes, and whose angle is twice the angle between the hyperplanes.

=== Support hyperplanes ===
A hyperplane H is called a "support" hyperplane of the polyhedron P if P is contained in one of the two closed half-spaces bounded by H and $H\cap P \neq \varnothing$. The intersection of P and H is defined to be a "face" of the polyhedron. The theory of polyhedra and the dimension of the faces are analyzed by looking at these intersections involving hyperplanes.

== See also ==
- Hypersurface
- Decision boundary
- Ham sandwich theorem
- Arrangement of hyperplanes
- Supporting hyperplane theorem
