= Equal-area =

Equal-area may refer to:

- Equal-area map projection
- Equiareal map
