= Euclidean group =

Isometry group of Euclidean space

In mathematics, a Euclidean group is the group of (Euclidean) isometries of a Euclidean space $\mathbb{E}^n$; that is, the transformations of that space that preserve the Euclidean distance between any two points (also called Euclidean transformations). The group depends only on the dimension n of the space, and is commonly denoted E(n) or ISO(n).

The Euclidean group E(n) comprises all translations, rotations, and reflections of $\mathbb{E}^n$; and arbitrary finite combinations of them. The Euclidean group can be seen as the symmetry group of the space itself, and contains the group of symmetries of any figure (subset) of that space.

A Euclidean isometry can be direct or indirect, depending on whether it preserves the handedness of figures. The direct Euclidean isometries form a subgroup, the special Euclidean group, often denoted SE(n) and E^{+}(n), whose elements are called rigid motions or Euclidean motions. They comprise arbitrary combinations of translations and rotations, but not reflections.

These groups are among the oldest and most studied, at least in the cases of dimension 2 and 3 – implicitly, long before the concept of group was invented.

== Overview ==
=== Dimensionality ===
The number of degrees of freedom for E(n) is n(n + 1)/2, which gives 3 in case n = 2, and 6 for n = 3. Of these, n can be attributed to available translational symmetry, and the remaining n(n − 1)/2 to rotational symmetry.

=== Direct and indirect isometries ===
The direct isometries (i.e., isometries preserving the handedness of chiral subsets) comprise a subgroup of E(n), called the special Euclidean group and usually denoted by E^{+}(n) or SE(n). They include the translations and rotations, and combinations thereof; including the identity transformation, but excluding any reflections.

The isometries that reverse handedness are called indirect, or opposite. For any fixed indirect isometry R, such as a reflection about some hyperplane, every other indirect isometry can be obtained by the composition of R with some direct isometry. Therefore, the indirect isometries are a coset of E^{+}(n), which can be denoted by E^{−}(n). It follows that the subgroup E^{+}(n) is of index 2 in E(n).

=== Topology of the group ===
The natural topology of Euclidean space $\mathbb{E}^n$ implies a topology for the Euclidean group E(n). Namely, a sequence f_{i} of isometries of $\mathbb{E}^n$ ($i \in \mathbb{N}$) is defined to converge if and only if, for any point p of $\mathbb{E}^n$, the sequence of points p_{i} converges.

From this definition it follows that a function $f:[0,1] \to E(n)$ is continuous if and only if, for any point p of $\mathbb{E}^n$, the function $f_p: [0,1] \to \mathbb{E}^n$ defined by f_{p}(t) = (f(t))(p) is continuous. Such a function is called a "continuous trajectory" in E(n).

It turns out that the special Euclidean group SE(n) = E^{+}(n) is connected in this topology. That is, given any two direct isometries A and B of $\mathbb{E}^n$, there is a continuous trajectory f in E^{+}(n) such that f(0) = A and f(1) = B. The same is true for the indirect isometries E^{−}(n). On the other hand, the group E(n) as a whole is not connected: there is no continuous trajectory that starts in E^{+}(n) and ends in E^{−}(n).

The continuous trajectories in E(3) play an important role in classical mechanics, because they describe the physically possible movements of a rigid body in three-dimensional space over time. One takes f(0) to be the identity transformation I of $\mathbb{E}^3$, which describes the initial position of the body. The position and orientation of the body at any later time t will be described by the transformation f(t). Since f(0) = I is in E^{+}(3), the same must be true of f(t) for any later time. For that reason, the direct Euclidean isometries are also called "rigid motions".

=== Lie structure ===
The Euclidean groups are not only topological groups, they are Lie groups, so that calculus notions can be adapted immediately to this setting.

=== Relation to the affine group ===
The Euclidean group E(n) is a subgroup of the affine group for n dimensions. Both groups have a structure as a semidirect product of the group of Euclidean translations with a group of origin-preserving transformations, and this product structure is respected by the inclusion of the Euclidean group in the affine group. This gives, a fortiori, two ways of writing elements in an explicit notation. These are:

1. by a pair (A, b), with A an n × n orthogonal matrix, and b a real column vector of size n; or
2. by a single square matrix of size n + 1, as explained for the affine group.

Details for the first representation are given in the next section.

In the terms of Felix Klein's Erlangen programme, we read off from this that Euclidean geometry, the geometry of the Euclidean group of symmetries, is, therefore, a specialisation of affine geometry. All affine theorems apply. The origin of Euclidean geometry allows definition of the notion of distance, from which angle can then be deduced.

== Detailed discussion ==
=== Subgroup structure, matrix and vector representation ===
The Euclidean group is a subgroup of the group of affine transformations.

It has as subgroups the translational group T(n), and the orthogonal group O(n). Any element of E(n) is a translation followed by an orthogonal transformation (the linear part of the isometry), in a unique way:
$$x \mapsto A (x + b)$$
where A is an orthogonal matrix

or the same orthogonal transformation followed by a translation:
$$x \mapsto A x + c,$$
with c = Ab

T(n) is a normal subgroup of E(n): for every translation t and every isometry u, the composition
$$u^{-1}tu$$
is again a translation.

Together, these facts imply that E(n) is the semidirect product of O(n) extended by T(n), which is written as $\text{E}(n) = \text{T}(n) \rtimes \text{O}(n)$. In other words, O(n) is (in the natural way) also the quotient group of E(n) by T(n):
$$\text{O}(n) \cong \text{E}(n) / \text{T}(n)$$

Now SO(n), the special orthogonal group, is a subgroup of O(n) of index two. Therefore, E(n) has a subgroup E^{+}(n), also of index two, consisting of direct isometries. In these cases the determinant of A is 1.

They are represented as a translation followed by a rotation, rather than a translation followed by some kind of reflection (in dimensions 2 and 3, these are the familiar reflections in a mirror line or plane, which may be taken to include the origin, or in 3D, a rotoreflection).

This relation is commonly written as:
$$\text{SO}(n) \cong \text{E}^+(n) / \text{T}(n)$$
or, equivalently:
$$\text{E}^+(n) = \text{SO}(n) \ltimes \text{T}(n).$$

=== Subgroups ===
Types of subgroups of E(n):

Finite groups.
They always have a fixed point. In 3D, for every point there are for every orientation two which are maximal (with respect to inclusion) among the finite groups: O_{h} and I_{h}. The groups I_{h} are even maximal among the groups including the next category.
Countably infinite groups without arbitrarily small translations, rotations, or combinations
i.e., for every point the set of images under the isometries is topologically discrete (e.g., for 1 ≤ m ≤ n a group generated by m translations in independent directions, and possibly a finite point group). This includes lattices. Examples more general than those are the discrete space groups.
Countably infinite groups with arbitrarily small translations, rotations, or combinations
In this case there are points for which the set of images under the isometries is not closed. Examples of such groups are, in 1D, the group generated by a translation of 1 and one of √2, and, in 2D, the group generated by a rotation about the origin by 1 radian.
Non-countable groups, where there are points for which the set of images under the isometries is not closed
(e.g., in 2D all translations in one direction, and all translations by rational distances in another direction).
Non-countable groups, where for all points the set of images under the isometries is closed
e.g.:
- all direct isometries that keep the origin fixed, or more generally, some point (in 3D called the rotation group)
- all isometries that keep the origin fixed, or more generally, some point (the orthogonal group)
- all direct isometries E^{+}(n)
- the whole Euclidean group E(n)
- one of these groups in an m-dimensional subspace combined with a discrete group of isometries in the orthogonal (n−m)-dimensional space
- one of these groups in an m-dimensional subspace combined with another one in the orthogonal (n−m)-dimensional space

Examples in 3D of combinations:

- all rotations about one fixed axis
- ditto combined with reflection in planes through the axis and/or a plane perpendicular to the axis
- ditto combined with discrete translation along the axis or with all isometries along the axis
- a discrete point group, frieze group, or wallpaper group in a plane, combined with any symmetry group in the perpendicular direction
- all isometries which are a combination of a rotation about some axis and a proportional translation along the axis; in general this is combined with k-fold rotational isometries about the same axis (k ≥ 1); the set of images of a point under the isometries is a k-fold helix; in addition there may be a 2-fold rotation about a perpendicularly intersecting axis, and hence a k-fold helix of such axes.
- for any point group: the group of all isometries which are a combination of an isometry in the point group and a translation; for example, in the case of the group generated by inversion in the origin: the group of all translations and inversion in all points; this is the generalized dihedral group of R^{3}, Dih(R^{3}).

=== Overview of isometries in up to three dimensions ===
E(1), E(2), and E(3) can be categorized as follows, with degrees of freedom:

Isometries of E(1)
Type of isometry	Degrees of freedom	Preserves orientation?
Identity	0	Yes
Translation	1	Yes
Reflection in a point	1	No

Isometries of E(2)
Type of isometry	Degrees of freedom	Preserves orientation?
Identity	0	Yes
Translation	2	Yes
Rotation about a point	3	Yes
Reflection in a line	2	No
Glide reflection	3	No

Isometries of E(3)
Type of isometry	Degrees of freedom	Preserves orientation?
Identity	0	Yes
Translation	3	Yes
Rotation about an axis	5	Yes
Screw displacement	6	Yes
Reflection in a plane	3	No
Glide plane operation	5	No
Improper rotation	6	No
Inversion in a point	3	No

Chasles' theorem asserts that any element of E^{+}(3) is a screw displacement.

See also 3D isometries that leave the origin fixed, space group, involution.

=== Commuting isometries ===
For some isometry pairs composition does not depend on order:

- two translations
- two rotations or screws about the same axis
- reflection with respect to a plane, and a translation in that plane, a rotation about an axis perpendicular to the plane, or a reflection with respect to a perpendicular plane
- glide reflection with respect to a plane, and a translation in that plane
- inversion in a point and any isometry keeping the point fixed
- rotation by 180° about an axis and reflection in a plane through that axis
- rotation by 180° about an axis and rotation by 180° about a perpendicular axis (results in rotation by 180° about the axis perpendicular to both)
- two rotoreflections about the same axis, with respect to the same plane
- two glide reflections with respect to the same plane

=== Conjugacy classes ===
The translations by a given distance in any direction form a conjugacy class; the translation group is the union of those for all distances.

In 1D, all reflections are in the same class.

In 2D, rotations by the same angle in either direction are in the same class. Glide reflections with translation by the same distance are in the same class.

In 3D:

- Inversions with respect to all points are in the same class.
- Rotations by the same angle are in the same class.
- Rotations about an axis combined with translation along that axis are in the same class if the angle is the same and the translation distance is the same.
- Reflections in a plane are in the same class
- Reflections in a plane combined with translation in that plane by the same distance are in the same class.
- Rotations about an axis by the same angle not equal to 180°, combined with reflection in a plane perpendicular to that axis, are in the same class.

== See also ==
- Fixed points of isometry groups in Euclidean space
- Euclidean plane isometry
- Poincaré group
- Coordinate rotations and reflections
- Reflection through the origin
- Plane of rotation
