= Subspace =

Subspace may refer to:

== Mathematics ==
- Subspace (mathematics), a particular subset of a parent space
- A subset of a topological space endowed with the subspace topology
- Linear subspace, in linear algebra, a subset of a vector space that is closed under addition and scalar multiplication
- Flat (geometry), a Euclidean subspace
- Affine subspace, a geometric structure that generalizes the affine properties of a flat
- Projective subspace, a geometric structure that generalizes a linear subspace of a vector space
- Multilinear subspace in multilinear algebra, a subset of a tensor space that is closed under addition and scalar multiplication

== Science fiction ==
- Also known as hyperspace
- Subspace (Star Trek), a theoretical feature of space-time that facilitates faster-than-light communication and transit

== Games ==
- SubSpace (video game), a two-dimensional space shooter computer game
- The Subspace Emissary, the Adventure mode in the video game Super Smash Bros. Brawl

== Other uses ==
- "Subspace" (song), a 2001 single by Funker Vogt
- Subspace, in BDSM, a psychological state that can be entered by the submissive participant
