= Object identity =

Object identity may refer to:

- Identity (object-oriented programming)
- Congruence (geometry)
