= Equiareal map =

Transformation that preserves area measure of regions

In differential geometry, an equiareal map, sometimes called an authalic map, is a smooth map from one surface to another that preserves the areas of figures.

== Properties ==
If M and N are two Riemannian (or pseudo-Riemannian) surfaces, then an equiareal map f from M to N can be characterized by any of the following equivalent conditions:

- The surface area of f(U) is equal to the area of U for every open set U on M.
- The pullback of the area element μ_{N} on N is equal to μ_{M}, the area element on M.
- At each point p of M, and tangent vectors v and w to M at p,

$$\bigl|df_p(v)\wedge df_p(w)\bigr| = |v\wedge w|\,$$

where $\wedge$ denotes the Euclidean wedge product of vectors and df denotes the pushforward along f.

== Linear transformations ==
Repeated squeeze mapping applied to a hyperbolic sector

Every Euclidean isometry of the Euclidean plane is equiareal, but the converse is not true. In fact, shear mapping and squeeze mapping are counterexamples to the converse.

Shear mapping takes a rectangle to a parallelogram of the same area. Written in matrix form, a shear mapping along the x-axis is

$$\begin{pmatrix}1 & v \\ 0 & 1 \end{pmatrix} \,\begin{pmatrix}x\\y \end{pmatrix} =   \begin{pmatrix}x+vy\\y \end{pmatrix}.$$

Squeeze mapping lengthens and contracts the sides of a rectangle in a reciprocal manner so that the area is preserved. Written in matrix form, with λ > 1 the squeeze reads

$$\begin{pmatrix}\lambda & 0 \\ 0 & 1/\lambda  \end{pmatrix}\,\begin{pmatrix}x\\y \end{pmatrix} = \begin{pmatrix}\lambda x\\ y/\lambda.\end{pmatrix}$$

A linear transformation
$$\begin{pmatrix}a & b \\ c & d \end{pmatrix}$$
multiplies areas by the absolute value of its determinant |ad – bc|.

Gaussian elimination shows that every equiareal linear transformation (rotations included) can be obtained by composing at most two shears along the axes, a squeeze and (if the determinant is negative), a reflection.

== In map projections ==
In the context of geographic maps, a map projection is called equal-area, equivalent, authalic, equiareal, or area-preserving, if areas are preserved up to a constant factor; embedding the target map, usually considered a subset of R^{2}, in the obvious way in R^{3}, the requirement above then is weakened to:

$$|df_p(v)\times df_p(w)|=\kappa|v\times w|$$

for some κ > 0 not depending on $v$ and $w$. For examples of such projections, see equal-area map projection.

== See also ==
- Jacobian matrix and determinant
