= One-dimensional space =

Space with one dimension

A one-dimensional (1D) space is a mathematical space in which location can be specified with a single coordinate. An example is the number line, each point of which is described by a single real number. Any straight line or smooth curve is a one-dimensional space, regardless of the dimension of the ambient space in which the line or curve is embedded. Examples include the circle on a plane, or a parametric space curve. In physical space, a 1D subspace is called a "linear dimension" (rectilinear or curvilinear), with units of length (e.g., metre).

In algebraic geometry there are several structures that are one-dimensional spaces but are usually referred to by more specific terms. Any field $K$ is a one-dimensional vector space over itself. The projective line over $K,$ denoted $\mathbf P^1(K),$ is a one-dimensional space. In particular, if the field is the complex numbers $\mathbb{C},$ then the complex projective line $\mathbf P^1(\mathbb{C})$ is one-dimensional with respect to $\mathbb{C}$ (but is sometimes called the Riemann sphere, as it is a model of the sphere, two-dimensional with respect to real-number coordinates).

For every eigenvector of a linear transformation T on a vector space V, there is a one-dimensional space A ⊂ V generated by the eigenvector such that T(A) = A, that is, A is an invariant set under the action of T.

In Lie theory, a one-dimensional subspace of a Lie algebra is mapped to a one-parameter group under the Lie group–Lie algebra correspondence.

More generally, a ring is a length-one module over itself. Similarly, the projective line over a ring is a one-dimensional space over the ring. In case the ring is an algebra over a field, these spaces are one-dimensional with respect to the algebra, even if the algebra is of higher dimensionality.

The number line

== Coordinate systems in one-dimensional space ==
One dimensional coordinate systems include the number line.

Number line

== See also ==
- Univariate
- Zero-dimensional space
