= Subspace (mathematics) =

Mathematical subset of a parent space which retains the same mathematical structure

1. REDIRECT Space (mathematics)
