= Reflection (mathematics) =

Mapping from a Euclidean space to itself

A reflection of a chiral shape through an axis (a diagonal red line here)

In mathematics, a reflection (also spelled reflexion) is a mapping from a Euclidean space to itself that is an isometry with a hyperplane as the set of fixed points; this set is called the axis (in dimension 2) or plane (in dimension 3) of reflection. The image of a figure by a reflection is its mirror image in the axis or plane of reflection. For example, the reflection of point A is A' such that the red line is the perpendicular bisector of the segment $\overline{AA'}$.

For example, the mirror image of the small Latin letter p for a reflection with respect to a vertical axis (a vertical reflection) would look like q. Its image by reflection in a horizontal axis (a horizontal reflection) would look like b. A reflection is an involution: when applied twice in succession, every point returns to its original location, and every geometrical object is restored to its original state.

The term reflection is sometimes used for a larger class of mappings from a Euclidean space to itself, namely the non-identity isometries that are involutions. The set of fixed points (the "mirror") of such an isometry is an affine subspace, but is possibly smaller than a hyperplane.

For instance, a reflection through a point is an involutive isometry with just one fixed point; the image of the letter p under it would look like a d. This operation is also known as a central inversion (Coxeter 1969, §7.2), and exhibits Euclidean space as a symmetric space.

In a Euclidean vector space, the reflection in the point situated at the origin is the same as vector negation. Other examples include reflections in a line in three-dimensional space. Typically, however, unqualified use of the term "reflection" means reflection in a hyperplane. Some mathematicians use "flip" as a synonym for "reflection".

== Construction ==
Point Q is the reflection of point P through the line AB.

In a plane (or, respectively, 3-dimensional) geometry, to find the reflection of a point drop a perpendicular from the point to the line (plane) used for reflection, and extend it the same distance on the other side. To find the reflection of a figure, reflect each point in the figure.

To reflect point P through the line AB using compass and straightedge, proceed as follows (see figure):

- Step 1 (red): construct a circle with center at P and some fixed radius r to create points A′ and B′ on the line AB, which will be equidistant from P.
- Step 2 (green): construct circles centered at A′ and B′ having radius r. P and Q will be the points of intersection of these two circles.

Point Q is then the reflection of point P through line AB.

== Properties ==
The matrix for a reflection is orthogonal with determinant −1 and eigenvalues −1, 1, 1, ..., 1. The product of two such matrices is a special orthogonal matrix that represents a rotation. Every rotation is the result of reflecting in an even number of reflections in hyperplanes through the origin, and every improper rotation is the result of reflecting in an odd number. Thus reflections generate the orthogonal group, and this result is known as the Cartan–Dieudonné theorem.

Similarly the Euclidean group, which consists of all isometries of Euclidean space, is generated by reflections in affine hyperplanes. In general, a group generated by reflections in affine hyperplanes is known as a reflection group. The finite groups generated in this way are examples of Coxeter groups.

== Reflection across a line in the plane ==
Reflection across an arbitrary line through the origin in two dimensions can be described by the following formula

$$\operatorname{Ref}_l(v) = 2\frac{v \cdot l}{l \cdot l}l - v,$$

where $v$ denotes the vector being reflected, $l$ denotes any vector in the line across which the reflection is performed, and $v\cdot l$ denotes the dot product of $v$ with $l$. Note the formula above can also be written as

$$\operatorname{Ref}_l(v) = 2\operatorname{Proj}_l(v) - v,$$

saying that a reflection of $v$ across $l$ is equal to 2 times the projection of $v$ on $l$, minus the vector $v$. Reflections in a line have the eigenvalues of 1, and −1.

== Reflection through a hyperplane in n dimensions ==
More generally, if $S$ is a linear subspace and $P_S$ is the orthogonal projection onto $S$, then reflection across $S$ is given by

$$R_S = 2P_S - I.$$

Reflection across a plane in ℝ³ using an orthogonal projection matrix. Here $P=U(U^TU)^{-1}U^T$ projects onto $\operatorname{col}(U)$, and $R=2P-I$ is the corresponding reflection.

This fixes every vector in $S$ and negates every vector in $S^\perp$. Since

$$P_S + P_{S^\perp} = I,$$

the same reflection may equivalently be written as

$$R_S = I - 2P_{S^\perp}.$$

Thus a reflection can be described either by the subspace that remains fixed or by its orthogonal complement, whose vectors are reversed. In the preceding two-dimensional section, $l$ spans the subspace that remains fixed; in the formula below, $a$ spans its orthogonal complement, whose vectors are reversed.

Given a vector $v$ in Euclidean space $\mathbb R^n$, the formula for the reflection in the hyperplane through the origin, orthogonal to $a$, is given by

$$\operatorname{Ref}_a(v) = v - 2\frac{v\cdot a}{a\cdot a}a,$$

where $v\cdot a$ denotes the dot product of $v$ with $a$. Note that the second term in the above equation is just twice the vector projection of $v$ onto $a$. One can easily check that

- Ref_{a}(v) = −v, if $v$ is parallel to $a$, and
- Ref_{a}(v) = v, if $v$ is perpendicular to a.

Using the geometric product, the formula is

$$\operatorname{Ref}_a(v) = -\frac{a v a}{a^2} .$$

Since these reflections are isometries of Euclidean space fixing the origin they may be represented by orthogonal matrices. The orthogonal matrix corresponding to the above reflection is the matrix

$$R = I-2\frac{aa^T}{a^Ta},$$

where $I$ denotes the $n \times n$ identity matrix and $a^T$ is the transpose of a. Its entries are

$$R_{ij} = \delta_{ij} - 2\frac{a_i a_j}{ \left\| a \right\| ^2 },$$

where δ_{ij} is the Kronecker delta.

The formula for the reflection in the affine hyperplane $v\cdot a=c$ not through the origin is

$$\operatorname{Ref}_{a,c}(v) = v - 2\frac{v \cdot a - c}{a\cdot a}a.$$

== See also ==
- Additive inverse
- Coordinate rotations and reflections
- Householder transformation
- Inversive geometry
- Plane of rotation
- Reflection mapping
- Reflection group
- Reflection symmetry
