= Thompson transitivity theorem =

In mathematical finite group theory, the Thompson transitivity theorem gives conditions under which the centralizer of an abelian subgroup A acts transitively on certain subgroups normalized by A. It originated in the proof of the odd order theorem by Feit and Thompson (1963), where it was used to prove the Thompson uniqueness theorem.

== Statement ==
Suppose that G is a finite group and p a prime such that all p-local subgroups are p-constrained. If A is a self-centralizing normal abelian subgroup of a p-Sylow subgroup such that A has rank at least 3, then the centralizer C_{G}(A) act transitively on the maximal A-invariant q subgroups of G for any prime q ≠ p.
