= Classification of Clifford algebras =

Classification in abstract algebra

In abstract algebra, in particular in the theory of nondegenerate quadratic forms on vector spaces, the finite-dimensional Clifford algebras for a nondegenerate quadratic form are completely classified as rings. In general, the Clifford algebra is either a central simple algebra or a direct sum of two copies of such an algebra. For Clifford algebras over real or complex field, this means that the Clifford algebra is isomorphic to a full matrix ring over R, C, or H (the quaternions), or to a direct sum of two such algebras that are (non-canonically) isomorphic. The dimensions of the matrix algebra, and what division ring (R, C, H) can be determined by the dimension of the vector space and invariants of the quadratic form (its signature, over the reals).

== Notation and conventions ==
The Clifford product is the manifest ring product for the Clifford algebra, and all algebra homomorphisms in this article are with respect to this ring product. Other products defined within Clifford algebras, such as the exterior product, and other structure, such as the distinguished subspace of generators V, are not used here. This article uses the (+) sign convention for Clifford multiplication so that
$$v^2 = Q(v)1$$
for all vectors v in the vector space of generators V, where Q is the quadratic form on the vector space V. We will denote the algebra of n × n matrices with entries in the division algebra K by M_{n}(K) or End(K^{n}). The direct sum of two such identical algebras will be denoted by M_{n}(K) ⊕ M_{n}(K), which is isomorphic to M_{n}(K ⊕ K).

== Complex case ==
The complex case is particularly simple: every nondegenerate quadratic form on a complex vector space is equivalent to the standard diagonal form

$$Q(u) = u_1^2 + u_2^2 + \cdots + u_n^2 ,$$

where n = dim(V), so there is essentially only one Clifford algebra for each dimension. This is because over the complex numbers one may multiply a basis vector by i, so positive and negative squares are equivalent. We will denote the Clifford algebra on C^{n} with the standard quadratic form by Cl_{n}(C).

There are two separate cases to consider, according to whether n is even or odd. When n is even, the algebra Cl_{n}(C) is central simple and so by the Artin–Wedderburn theorem is isomorphic to a matrix algebra over C.

When n is odd, the center includes not only the scalars but the pseudoscalars (degree n elements) as well. After rescaling the volume element by a nonzero complex scalar if necessary, one may choose a normalized pseudoscalar ω such that ω^{2} = 1. Define the operators

$$P_{\pm} = \frac{1}{2}(1\pm\omega).$$

These two operators form a complete set of orthogonal idempotents, and since they are central they give a decomposition of Cl_{n}(C) into a direct sum of two algebras

$$\mathrm{Cl}_n(\mathbf{C}) = \mathrm{Cl}_n^+(\mathbf{C}) \oplus \mathrm{Cl}_n^-(\mathbf{C}),$$

where

$$\mathrm{Cl}_n^\pm(\mathbf{C}) = P_\pm \mathrm{Cl}_n(\mathbf{C}).$$

The algebras Cl_{n}^{±}(C) are just the positive and negative eigenspaces of ω, and the P_{±} are the corresponding projection operators. Since ω is odd, these algebras are exchanged by the involution α induced by v ↦ −v on the generating space:

$$\alpha\left(\mathrm{Cl}_n^\pm(\mathbf{C})\right) = \mathrm{Cl}_n^\mp(\mathbf{C}) ,$$

and are therefore isomorphic. Each of these two summands is central simple and hence isomorphic to a matrix algebra over C. The sizes of the matrices are determined from the fact that the dimension of Cl_{n}(C) is 2^{n}. What one obtains is the following table:

Classification of complex Clifford algebras
n	Cl_{n}(C)	Cl^{[0]}_{n}(C)	N
even	End(C^{N})	End(C^{N/2}) ⊕ End(C^{N/2})	2^{n/2}
odd	End(C^{N}) ⊕ End(C^{N})	End(C^{N})	2^{(n−1)/2}

The even subalgebra Cl^{[0]}_{n}(C) is (non-canonically) isomorphic to Cl_{n−1}(C). When n is even, the even subalgebra can be identified with the block diagonal matrices (after writing elements in 2 × 2 block form). When n is odd, the even subalgebra consists of those elements of End(C^{N}) ⊕ End(C^{N}) for which the two components are equal. Projection onto either factor then gives an isomorphism with Cl_{n}^{[0]}(C) ≅ End(C^{N}).

=== Complex spinors in even dimension ===
The classification allows Dirac spinors and Weyl spinors to be defined in even dimension.

In even dimension n, the Clifford algebra Cl_{n}(C) is isomorphic to End(C^{N}), which has its fundamental representation on Δ_{n} := C^{N}. A complex Dirac spinor is an element of Δ_{n}. The word complex indicates that this is a module for a complex Clifford algebra, not merely that the underlying vector space is complex.

The even subalgebra Cl_{n}^{0}(C) is isomorphic to End(C^{N/2}) ⊕ End(C^{N/2}) and therefore its spinor module decomposes as the direct sum of two irreducible representation spaces Δ^{+}_{n} ⊕ Δ^{−}_{n}, each isomorphic to C^{N/2}. A left-handed (respectively right-handed) complex Weyl spinor is an element of Δ^{+}_{n} (respectively, Δ^{−}_{n}).

=== Proof of the structure theorem for complex Clifford algebras ===
The structure theorem may be proved inductively. For the base cases, Cl_{0}(C) is simply C ≅ End(C), while Cl_{1}(C) is the algebra C ⊕ C ≅ End(C) ⊕ End(C), obtained by taking the unique generator to be γ_{1} = (1, −1).

One also needs Cl_{2}(C) ≅ End(C^{2}). The Pauli matrices give a concrete realization: if one sets γ_{1} = σ_{1} and γ_{2} = σ_{2}, then these generate a copy of Cl_{2}(C) whose span is all of End(C^{2}).

The inductive step is the standard 2-periodicity isomorphism

$$\mathrm{Cl}_{n+2}(\mathbf{C}) \cong \mathrm{Cl}_n(\mathbf{C}) \otimes \mathrm{Cl}_2(\mathbf{C}).$$

To construct it, let γ_{a} generate Cl_{n}(C), and let $\tilde \gamma_1,\tilde \gamma_2$ generate Cl_{2}(C). Let ω = i\tilde\gamma_1 \tilde\gamma_2 be the chirality element in Cl_{2}(C), so that ω^{2} = 1 and each $\tilde\gamma_a$ anticommutes with ω. Then one obtains generators for Cl_{n+2}(C) by setting

$$\Gamma_a = \gamma_a \otimes \omega \qquad (1 \le a \le n),$$
$$\Gamma_{n+1} = 1 \otimes \tilde\gamma_1,\qquad \Gamma_{n+2} = 1 \otimes \tilde\gamma_2.$$

These satisfy the Clifford relations, so by the universal property of Clifford algebras they induce an isomorphism Cl_{n}(C) ⊗ Cl_{2}(C) \to Cl_{n+2}(C).

Finally, if n is even and Cl_{n}(C) ≅ End(C^{N}), then

$$\mathrm{Cl}_{n+2}(\mathbf{C}) \cong \operatorname{End}(\mathbf{C}^N)\otimes \operatorname{End}(\mathbf{C}^2) \cong \operatorname{End}(\mathbf{C}^{2N}).$$

Since 2N = 2^{(n+2)/2}, this gives the even-dimensional case in dimension n+2. The odd-dimensional case follows similarly, using that tensor product distributes over direct sums.

=== Proof of the structure theorem for complex Clifford algebras ===
A standard proof proceeds from three ingredients: the low-dimensional base cases, the 2-periodicity isomorphism

$$\mathrm{Cl}_{n+2}(\mathbf{C}) \cong \mathrm{Cl}_n(\mathbf{C}) \otimes \mathrm{Cl}_2(\mathbf{C}),$$

and the identification of the even subalgebra

$$\mathrm{Cl}_{n+1}(\mathbf{C})^0 \cong \mathrm{Cl}_n(\mathbf{C}).$$

See, for example, Porteous (1995) or Lawson & Michelsohn (2016).

For the base cases, one has

$$\mathrm{Cl}_0(\mathbf{C}) \cong \mathbf{C}$$

and

$$\mathrm{Cl}_1(\mathbf{C}) \cong \mathbf{C}\oplus\mathbf{C}.$$

The first is immediate. For the second, if $e$ is the generator with $e^2=1$, then

$$P_\pm=\frac{1}{2}(1\pm e)$$

are central orthogonal idempotents with $P_++P_-=1$, so the algebra splits as the direct sum of the two one-dimensional ideals $\mathbf{C}P_+$ and $\mathbf{C}P_-$.

Next, one needs the two-dimensional case

$$\mathrm{Cl}_2(\mathbf{C}) \cong M_2(\mathbf{C}).$$

A concrete realization is obtained from the Pauli matrices:

$$\gamma_1=\sigma_1=\begin{pmatrix}0&1\\1&0\end{pmatrix},\qquad
\gamma_2=\sigma_2=\begin{pmatrix}0&-i\\ i&0\end{pmatrix}.$$

These satisfy $\gamma_i\gamma_j+\gamma_j\gamma_i=2\delta_{ij}$, so by the universal property they define a homomorphism $\mathrm{Cl}_2(\mathbf{C})\to M_2(\mathbf{C})$. Since the image contains $1,\gamma_1,\gamma_2,\gamma_1\gamma_2$, it has dimension 4 and hence is all of $M_2(\mathbf{C})$.

The key step is the 2-periodicity isomorphism. Let $\gamma_1,\dots,\gamma_n$ generate $\mathrm{Cl}_n(\mathbf{C})$, let $\tilde\gamma_1,\tilde\gamma_2$ generate $\mathrm{Cl}_2(\mathbf{C})$, and set

$$\omega=i\tilde\gamma_1\tilde\gamma_2.$$

Then $\omega^2=1$ and $\omega$ anticommutes with both $\tilde\gamma_1$ and $\tilde\gamma_2$. Define elements of $\mathrm{Cl}_n(\mathbf{C})\otimes \mathrm{Cl}_2(\mathbf{C})$ by

$$\Gamma_a=\gamma_a\otimes \omega \qquad (1\le a\le n),$$
$$\Gamma_{n+1}=1\otimes \tilde\gamma_1,\qquad \Gamma_{n+2}=1\otimes \tilde\gamma_2.$$

Because $\omega^2=1$ and $\omega$ anticommutes with the generators of $\mathrm{Cl}_2(\mathbf{C})$, the elements $\Gamma_1,\dots,\Gamma_{n+2}$ satisfy the Clifford relations for the standard quadratic form on $\mathbf{C}^{n+2}$. Therefore the universal property gives a homomorphism

$$\mathrm{Cl}_{n+2}(\mathbf{C})\to \mathrm{Cl}_n(\mathbf{C})\otimes \mathrm{Cl}_2(\mathbf{C}).$$

Both algebras have dimension $2^{n+2}$, so this homomorphism is an isomorphism.

It follows by induction on $m$ that

$$\mathrm{Cl}_{2m}(\mathbf{C})\cong \mathrm{Cl}_0(\mathbf{C})\otimes \mathrm{Cl}_2(\mathbf{C})^{\otimes m}
\cong M_{2^m}(\mathbf{C}).$$

Indeed, the case $m=0$ is $\mathrm{Cl}_0(\mathbf{C})\cong \mathbf{C}$, and each application of 2-periodicity tensors with $\mathrm{Cl}_2(\mathbf{C})\cong M_2(\mathbf{C})$, doubling the matrix size.

For odd dimension, let $n=2m+1$. The volume element $\omega=e_1e_2\cdots e_n$ is central because $n$ is odd, and over $\mathbf{C}$ it may be rescaled so that $\omega^2=1$. Hence

$$P_\pm=\frac{1}{2}(1\pm \omega)$$

are central orthogonal idempotents, giving a decomposition

$$\mathrm{Cl}_{2m+1}(\mathbf{C})=\mathrm{Cl}_{2m+1}^+(\mathbf{C})\oplus \mathrm{Cl}_{2m+1}^-(\mathbf{C}).$$

On the other hand, the even subalgebra is isomorphic to $\mathrm{Cl}_{2m}(\mathbf{C})$, and projection onto either summand identifies each simple factor with that even subalgebra. Since

$$\mathrm{Cl}_{2m}(\mathbf{C})\cong M_{2^m}(\mathbf{C}),$$

one obtains

$\mathrm{Cl}_{2m+1}(\mathbf{C})\cong M_{2^m}(\mathbf{C})\oplus M_{2^m}(\mathbf{C}).$

This proves the classification:

$$\mathrm{Cl}_{2m}(\mathbf{C})\cong M_{2^m}(\mathbf{C}),\qquad
\mathrm{Cl}_{2m+1}(\mathbf{C})\cong M_{2^m}(\mathbf{C})\oplus M_{2^m}(\mathbf{C}).$$

Equivalently, the complex Clifford algebras are 2-periodic, and the even subalgebra of $\mathrm{Cl}_{n+1}(\mathbf{C})$ is isomorphic to $\mathrm{Cl}_n(\mathbf{C})$.

== Real case ==
The real case is significantly more complicated, exhibiting a periodicity of 8 rather than 2, and there is a 2-parameter family of Clifford algebras.

=== Classification of quadratic forms ===
Firstly, there are non-isomorphic quadratic forms of a given degree, classified by signature.

Every nondegenerate quadratic form on a real vector space is equivalent to a diagonal form

$$Q(u) = u_1^2 + \cdots + u_p^2 - u_{p+1}^2 - \cdots - u_{p+q}^2$$

where n = p + q is the dimension of the vector space. The pair of integers (p, q) is called the signature of the quadratic form. The real vector space with this quadratic form is often denoted R^{p,q}. The Clifford algebra on R^{p,q} is denoted Cl_{p,q}(R).

A standard orthonormal basis {e_{i}} for R^{p,q} consists of n = p + q mutually orthogonal vectors, p of which have norm +1 and q of which have norm −1.

=== Unit pseudoscalar ===
Given a standard basis {e_{i}} as defined in the previous subsection, the unit pseudoscalar in Cl_{p,q}(R) is defined as

$$\omega = e_1e_2\cdots e_n.$$

It is the Clifford-algebra analogue of the volume element.

To compute the square $\omega^2 = (e_1 e_2 \cdots e_n)(e_1 e_2 \cdots e_n)$, one may reverse the order of the second factor and then commute equal basis vectors together. This introduces the sign (−1)^{n(n−1)/2}, and since e_{i}^{2} = +1 for i \le p and e_{i}^{2} = -1 for the remaining q basis vectors, one obtains

$$\omega^2 = (-1)^{\frac{n(n-1)}{2}}(-1)^q = (-1)^{\frac{(p-q)(p-q-1)}{2}} = \begin{cases}+1 & p-q \equiv 0,1 \pmod 4\\ -1 & p-q \equiv 2,3 \pmod 4.\end{cases}$$

Note that, unlike the complex case, it is not in general possible to find a pseudoscalar that squares to +1.

=== Center ===
If n (equivalently, p − q) is even, the algebra Cl_{p,q}(R) is central simple and so isomorphic to a matrix algebra over R or H by the Artin–Wedderburn theorem.

If n is odd then the algebra is no longer central simple: its center contains the pseudoscalar as well as the scalars. If n is odd and ω^{2} = +1 (equivalently, if p − q ≡ 1 (mod 4)) then, just as in the complex case, the algebra Cl_{p,q}(R) decomposes into a direct sum of isomorphic algebras

$$\operatorname{Cl}_{p,q}(\mathbf{R}) = \operatorname{Cl}_{p,q}^{+}(\mathbf{R})\oplus \operatorname{Cl}_{p,q}^{-}(\mathbf{R}) ,$$

each of which is central simple and so isomorphic to a matrix algebra over R or H.

If n is odd and ω^{2} = −1 (equivalently, if p − q ≡ −1 (mod 4)) then the center of Cl_{p,q}(R) is isomorphic to C, and the algebra may be regarded as a complex central simple algebra; hence it is isomorphic to a matrix algebra over C.

=== Classification ===
All told there are three properties which determine the class of the algebra Cl_{p,q}(R):

- signature mod 2: n is even/odd, determining whether the algebra is central simple or not;
- signature mod 4: ω^{2} = ±1, determining in the odd-dimensional case whether the center is R ⊕ R or C;
- signature mod 8: the Brauer class of the algebra (n even) or of the even subalgebra (n odd), determining whether the central simple factor is split or quaternionic.

Each of these properties depends only on the signature p − q modulo 8. The complete classification table is given below. The size of the matrices is determined by the requirement that Cl_{p,q}(R) have dimension 2^{p+q}.

p − q mod 8	ω^{2}	Cl_{p,q}(R) (N = 2^{(p+q)/2})	p − q mod 8	ω^{2}	Cl_{p,q}(R) (N = 2^{(p+q−1)/2})
0	+	M_{N}(R)	1	+	M_{N}(R) ⊕ M_{N}(R)
2	−	M_{N}(R)	3	−	M_{N}(C)
4	+	M_{N/2}(H)	5	+	M_{N/2}(H) ⊕ M_{N/2}(H)
6	−	M_{N/2}(H)	7	−	M_{N}(C)

It may be seen that of all matrix-ring types mentioned, there is only one type shared by complex and real algebras: the type M_{2^{m}}(C). For example, Cl_{2}(C) and Cl_{3,0}(R) are both isomorphic to M_{2}(C). It is important to distinguish the categories in which these isomorphisms are taken: Cl_{2}(C) is classified as a C-algebra, whereas Cl_{3,0}(R) is classified as an R-algebra. Thus the two are R-algebra isomorphic, but not canonically as complex algebras.

A table of this classification for p + q ≤ 8 follows. Here p + q runs vertically and p − q runs horizontally (e.g. the algebra Cl_{1,3}(R) ≅ M_{2}(H) is found in row 4, column −2).

	8	7	6	5	4	3	2	1	0	−1	−2	−3	−4	−5	−6	−7	−8
0									R
1								R^{2}		C
2							M_{2}(R)		M_{2}(R)		H
3						M_{2}(C)		M^{2}_{2}(R)		M_{2}(C)		H^{2}
4					M_{2}(H)		M_{4}(R)		M_{4}(R)		M_{2}(H)		M_{2}(H)
5				M^{2}_{2}(H)		M_{4}(C)		M^{2}_{4}(R)		M_{4}(C)		M^{2}_{2}(H)		M_{4}(C)
6			M_{4}(H)		M_{4}(H)		M_{8}(R)		M_{8}(R)		M_{4}(H)		M_{4}(H)		M_{8}(R)
7		M_{8}(C)		M^{2}_{4}(H)		M_{8}(C)		M^{2}_{8}(R)		M_{8}(C)		M^{2}_{4}(H)		M_{8}(C)		M^{2}_{8}(R)
8	M_{16}(R)		M_{8}(H)		M_{8}(H)		M_{16}(R)		M_{16}(R)		M_{8}(H)		M_{8}(H)		M_{16}(R)		M_{16}(R)
ω^{2}	+	−	−	+	+	−	−	+	+	−	−	+	+	−	−	+	+

=== Symmetries ===
There is a tangled web of symmetries and relationships in the above table. Most importantly, one has the standard real-periodicity isomorphisms

$$\begin{align}
\operatorname{Cl}_{p+1,q+1}(\mathbf{R}) &\cong \operatorname{Cl}_{p,q}(\mathbf{R}) \otimes \operatorname{M}_2(\mathbf{R}), \\
\operatorname{Cl}_{p+2,q}(\mathbf{R}) &\cong \operatorname{Cl}_{p,q}(\mathbf{R}) \otimes \mathbf{H}, \\
\operatorname{Cl}_{p,q+2}(\mathbf{R}) &\cong \operatorname{Cl}_{p,q}(\mathbf{R}) \otimes \operatorname{M}_2(\mathbf{R}) .
\end{align}$$

In terms of the table, the first rule says that going down one step from the Clifford algebra $\operatorname{Cl}_{p,q}(\mathbf{R})$ yields $\operatorname{Cl}_{p+1,q+1}(\mathbf{R})$, which consists of $2 \times 2$ matrices over $\operatorname{Cl}_{p,q}(\mathbf{R})$. The other two rules imply that

$$\operatorname{Cl}_{p+4,q}(\mathbf{R}) \cong \operatorname{Cl}_{p,q+4}(\mathbf{R})$$

and from these one obtains Bott periodicity in the form

$\operatorname{Cl}_{p+8,q}(\mathbf{R}) \cong \operatorname{Cl}_{p+4,q+4}(\mathbf{R}) \cong \operatorname{Cl}_{p,q+8}(\mathbf{R}) \cong \operatorname{M}_{16}(\operatorname{Cl}_{p,q}(\mathbf{R})) .$

Furthermore, if the signature satisfies p − q ≡ 1 (mod 4) then

$$\operatorname{Cl}_{p+k,q}(\mathbf{R}) \cong \operatorname{Cl}_{p,q+k}(\mathbf{R}) .$$

This says that the table is symmetric about columns where $p - q =$ ..., −7, −3, 1, 5, 9,....

=== Bott periodicity ===
The 8-fold periodicity over the real numbers is part of Bott periodicity, the corresponding periodicity for the homotopy groups of the stable orthogonal group; similarly, over the complex numbers one has 2-fold periodicity for the stable unitary group. In Bott's geometric description, the relevant loop spaces are modeled by successive quotients of the classical groups, which are compact symmetric spaces. In stable group theory, loop spaces enter because Bott periodicity identifies the stable classical groups, up to homotopy, with iterated loop spaces of the corresponding classifying spaces. The matching 2-fold and 8-fold algebraic periodicities of complex and real Clifford algebras are part of the same picture.

=== Failure of symmetry under swapping p and q ===
Note that in the real classification, in general,

$$\operatorname{Cl}_{p,q}(\mathbf{R}) \not\cong \operatorname{Cl}_{q,p}(\mathbf{R}).$$

In the sign convention used in this article, exchanging p and q replaces the quadratic form by its negative, so it sends the signature difference p − q to q − p = −(p − q). Since the isomorphism class of the real Clifford algebra is determined by p − q (mod 8), one should compare the entries in the classification table for residues d and −d modulo 8.

These entries agree only when d ≡ −d (mod 8), that is, only when d ≡ 0 or 4 (mod 8). In all other congruence classes, the algebras are of different types. For example,

$$\operatorname{Cl}_{1,0}(\mathbf{R}) \cong \mathbf{R}\oplus \mathbf{R},\qquad \operatorname{Cl}_{0,1}(\mathbf{R}) \cong \mathbf{C},$$

while

$$\operatorname{Cl}_{2,0}(\mathbf{R}) \cong M_2(\mathbf{R}),\qquad \operatorname{Cl}_{0,2}(\mathbf{R}) \cong \mathbf{H}.$$

So the failure of symmetry appears already in the first few low-dimensional cases.

There are two different mechanisms behind this asymmetry. In odd dimension, the distinction is visible in the center. If p − q ≡ 1 (mod 4), then ω^{2} = +1 and the algebra splits as a direct sum of two simple ideals, so its center is R⊕R. If instead p − q ≡ −1 (mod 4), then ω^{2} = −1 and the center is C. Thus swapping p and q can change the center from split real to complex.

In even dimension, both algebras are central simple, so the distinction is instead in their Brauer classes. For example, when p − q ≡ 2 (mod 8) the algebra is a split matrix algebra over R, while when q − p ≡ 2 (mod 8)—equivalently p − q ≡ 6 (mod 8)—the algebra is a matrix algebra over H. So swapping p and q can also change a split algebra into a quaternionic one.

Equivalently, one has

$$\operatorname{Cl}_{p,q}(\mathbf{R}) \cong \operatorname{Cl}_{q,p}(\mathbf{R})$$

if and only if p − q ≡ 0 or 4 (mod 8). This is simply the fixed-point condition for the involution $d\mapsto -d$ on the real classification table.

This is one reason sign conventions matter in the literature: authors using the opposite convention for Clifford multiplication often write $\operatorname{Cl}_{p,q}$ for what this article denotes by $\operatorname{Cl}_{q,p}$. The non-symmetry under $(p,q)\mapsto(q,p)$ is a property of real Clifford algebras, not just a notational artefact.

This asymmetry belongs to the full Clifford algebra, not to the spin group. Let (V,q) be a real quadratic space. The spin group is defined inside the even Clifford algebra by

$$\operatorname{Spin}(V,q)=\operatorname{Pin}(V,q)\cap \operatorname{Cl}^0(V,q),$$

where Pin(V,q) is generated by the unit vectors v with q(v)=± 1. Under the standard twisted-adjoint action, such a vector acts on V by reflection in the hyperplane orthogonal to v, so products of an even number of unit vectors act by orientation-preserving orthogonal transformations.

Now replacing q by −q does not change the orthogonal group: the same linear maps preserve q and −q, so O(V,q)=O(V,−q) and hence SO(V,q)=SO(V,−q). This is why one has SO(p,q) ≅ SO(q,p) and correspondingly Spin(p,q) ≅ Spin(q,p). The point is that although the Clifford algebras need not be the same, the spin group is built from even products of the same reflections, inside the even Clifford algebra.

The lowest-dimensional examples already show the distinction. In the sign convention used in this article,

$$\operatorname{Cl}_{1,0}(\mathbf{R}) \cong \mathbf{R}\oplus\mathbf{R},\qquad \operatorname{Cl}_{0,1}(\mathbf{R}) \cong \mathbf{C},$$

so the full algebras are different, but in both cases the even subalgebra is just R. Hence

$$\operatorname{Spin}(1,0)\cong \operatorname{Spin}(0,1)\cong \{\pm 1\}.$$

A more instructive example is

$$\operatorname{Cl}_{2,0}(\mathbf{R}) \cong M_2(\mathbf{R}),\qquad \operatorname{Cl}_{0,2}(\mathbf{R}) \cong \mathbf{H}.$$

Here the full algebras, and therefore their irreducible real modules, are of different types: in the first case the irreducible module is real 2-dimensional, whereas in the second it is quaternionic 1-dimensional. But the spin group only sees the even subalgebra. In both signatures the even subalgebra is generated by 1 and the bivector e_{1}e_{2}, and

$$(e_1e_2)^2=-e_1^2e_2^2=-1.$$

Therefore

$$\operatorname{Cl}_{2,0}^0(\mathbf{R}) \cong \operatorname{Cl}_{0,2}^0(\mathbf{R}) \cong \mathbf{C},$$

and in either case the spin group is the circle group

$$\{\cos\theta+\sin\theta\,e_1e_2:\theta\in\mathbf{R}\}\cong U(1).$$

So the full Clifford algebra can distinguish real and quaternionic module types even when the associated spin group cannot: after passing to the even subalgebra, both cases are governed by the same complex structure.

The same phenomenon persists in higher dimensions. For example, although $\operatorname{Cl}_{1,3}(\mathbf{R})$ and $\operatorname{Cl}_{3,1}(\mathbf{R})$ are different entries in the real classification table, the associated spin groups are both the double cover of the Lorentz group; in particular

$$\operatorname{Spin}(1,3)\cong \operatorname{SL}_2(\mathbf{C}),$$

and hence also $\operatorname{Spin}(3,1)\cong \operatorname{SL}_2(\mathbf{C})$.

== General fields ==
Let F be a field of characteristic not 2, and let $q$ be a nondegenerate quadratic form on a finite-dimensional F-vector space $V$. Over such a field, the classification of Clifford algebras is naturally expressed in terms of the center and a Brauer class rather than by a periodic matrix table.

If $\dim V = 2m$ is even, then the full Clifford algebra $\operatorname{Cl}(V,q)$ is a central simple algebra over $F$. Its Brauer class

$$c(q):=[\operatorname{Cl}(V,q)]\in \operatorname{Br}(F)$$

is called the Clifford invariant of $q$. The center of the even Clifford algebra $\operatorname{Cl}^0(V,q)$ is the quadratic étale $F$-algebra

$$Z(q)=F[x]/(x^2-\delta(q))$$,

where $\delta(q)=(-1)^m \det(q)$ is the signed discriminant of $q$. Thus $Z(q)$ is either a separable quadratic extension field of $F$ or the split algebra $F\oplus F$.

If $\dim V = 2m+1$ is odd, then the even Clifford algebra $\operatorname{Cl}^0(V,q)$ is central simple over $F$. In this case the relevant Clifford invariant is

$$c(q):=[\operatorname{Cl}^0(V,q)]\in \operatorname{Br}(F),$$

while the full Clifford algebra has center $Z(q)$ and satisfies

$$\operatorname{Cl}(V,q)\cong \operatorname{Cl}^0(V,q)\otimes_F Z(q).$$

Thus, in odd dimension, the isomorphism class of the full Clifford algebra is determined by the quadratic étale center $Z(q)$ together with the Brauer class $c(q)$.

An explicit computation of $c(q)$ may be made after diagonalizing

$$q \cong \langle a_1,\dots,a_n\rangle.$$

The associated Hasse invariant is the 2-torsion Brauer class

$$s(q)=\prod_{1\le i<j\le n}(a_i,a_j)\in \operatorname{Br}(F)[2],$$

where $(a_i,a_j)$ denotes the class of the quaternion algebra generated by $i,j$ with $i^2=a_i$, $j^2=a_j$, and $ij=-ji$. The Clifford invariant is obtained from the Hasse invariant by a universal correction depending only on $n\bmod 8$:

$$c(q)=s(q)\cdot
\begin{cases}
1, & n\equiv 1,2 \pmod 8,\\
(-1,-\det q), & n\equiv 3,4 \pmod 8,\\
(-1,-1), & n\equiv 5,6 \pmod 8,\\
(-1,\det q), & n\equiv 0,7 \pmod 8.
\end{cases}$$

Here $\det q$ is the determinant of a Gram matrix, viewed in $F^\times/F^{\times 2}$. In this sense, the Brauer class of the relevant Clifford algebra is the standard Clifford invariant of the quadratic form.

Over $\mathbf{R}$, this recovers the usual real classification table above. The Brauer group $\operatorname{Br}(\mathbf{R})$ has two elements, represented by the split class and the class of the quaternion algebra $\mathbf{H}$. For a diagonal form of signature $(p,q)$, the Hasse invariant is

$$s(q)=[\mathbf{H}]^{\binom{q}{2}},$$

since over $\mathbf{R}$ the quaternion class $(a,b)$ is nontrivial exactly when both $a$ and $b$ are negative. The formula above therefore determines abstractly whether the relevant central simple algebra is split or quaternionic. In even dimension this yields matrix algebras over $\mathbf{R}$ or $\mathbf{H}$; in odd dimension one combines the same Brauer-class computation for $\operatorname{Cl}^0(V,q)$ with the center $Z(q)$, which is either $\mathbf{R}\times\mathbf{R}$ or $\mathbf{C}$. When $Z(q)\cong \mathbf{C}$, the full Clifford algebra is a complex matrix algebra, because

$\mathbf{C}\otimes_{\mathbf{R}}\mathbf{H}\cong M_2(\mathbf{C}).$

The same viewpoint extends to nonarchimedean local fields. If $K$ is a local field of characteristic not 2, then quadratic spaces over $K$ are classified up to isometry by dimension, determinant, and Clifford invariant; equivalently, one may use dimension, determinant, and Hasse invariant. The Brauer group $\operatorname{Br}(K)$ has exactly two elements of order dividing 2, namely the split class and the class of the unique quaternion division algebra over $K$. Accordingly, the Brauer-class part of the Clifford-algebra classification over $K$ is especially simple. If $q$ has even dimension $2m$, then $\operatorname{Cl}(q)$ is isomorphic either to $M_{2^m}(K)$ or to $M_{2^{m-1}}(D)$, where $D$ is the quaternion division algebra over $K$. If $q$ has odd dimension $2m+1$, then $\operatorname{Cl}^0(q)$ is isomorphic either to $M_{2^m}(K)$ or to $M_{2^{m-1}}(D)$; the full Clifford algebra is then obtained from $\operatorname{Cl}^0(q)$ by adjoining its quadratic étale center. In practice one diagonalizes $q$, computes the Hilbert-symbol product $s(q)=\prod_{i<j}(a_i,a_j)$, and then obtains $c(q)$ from the same formula relating Hasse and Clifford invariants.

=== Characteristic two ===
The preceding discussion assumed that the ground field has characteristic different from 2. In characteristic 2, the polar form of a quadratic form is alternating, so a nonsingular quadratic space must have even dimension. Odd-dimensional forms are still important, but they are treated using the theory of regular (or “1/2-regular”) quadratic forms rather than the nonsingular theory.

For this reason, the characteristic-2 theory is usually formulated not only in terms of quadratic forms, but in terms of quadratic pairs on central simple algebras. In that setting the discriminant and the even Clifford algebra are defined for quadratic pairs and play the role of the corresponding invariants in characteristic different from 2. Accordingly, there is no direct analogue of the real-signature classification table in characteristic 2 without first reformulating the theory in this language.

== See also ==
- Clifford algebra
- Dirac algebra Cl_{1,3}(C)
- Pauli algebra Cl_{3,0}(R)
- Spacetime algebra Cl_{1,3}(R)
- Clifford module
- Spin representation

== Sources ==
- Atiyah, Michael F.; Bott, Raoul; Shapiro, Arnold (1964). "Clifford modules". Topology. 3 (Suppl. 1): 3–38. doi:10.1016/0040-9383(64)90003-5.
- Bott, Raoul (1970). "The periodicity theorem for the classical groups and some of its applications". Advances in Mathematics. 4 (3): 353–411. doi:10.1016/0001-8708(70)90030-7.
- Budinich, Paolo; Trautman, Andrzej (1988). The Spinorial Chessboard. Springer Verlag. ISBN 978-3-540-19078-3.
- Lam, T. Y. (2005). Introduction to Quadratic Forms over Fields. Graduate Studies in Mathematics. Vol. 67. American Mathematical Society.
- Lawson, H. Blaine; Michelsohn, Marie-Louise (2016). Spin Geometry. Princeton Mathematical Series. Vol. 38. Princeton University Press. ISBN 978-1-4008-8391-2.
- Porteous, Ian R. (1995). Clifford Algebras and the Classical Groups. Cambridge Studies in Advanced Mathematics. Vol. 50. Cambridge University Press. ISBN 978-0-521-55177-9.
