= P-stable group =

Algebraic structure

In finite group theory, a p-stable group for an odd prime p is a finite group satisfying a technical condition introduced by Gorenstein and Walter (1964, p.169, 1965) in order to extend Thompson's uniqueness results in the odd order theorem to groups with dihedral Sylow 2-subgroups.

== Definitions ==
There are several equivalent definitions of a p-stable group.

=== Glauberman ===
We give definition of a p-stable group in two parts. The definition used here comes from (Glauberman 1968, p. 1104).

1. Let p be an odd prime and G be a finite group with a nontrivial p-core $O_p(G)$. Then G is p-stable if it satisfies the following condition: Let P be an arbitrary p-subgroup of G such that $O_{p'\!}(G)$ is a normal subgroup of G. Suppose that $x \in N_G(P)$ and $\bar x$ is the coset of $C_G(P)$ containing x. If $[P,x,x]=1$, then $\overline{x}\in O_n(N_G(P)/C_G(P))$.

Now, define $\mathcal{M}_p(G)$ as the set of all p-subgroups of G maximal with respect to the property that $O_p(M)\not= 1$.

2. Let G be a finite group and p an odd prime. Then G is called p-stable if every element of $\mathcal{M}_p(G)$ is p-stable by definition 1.

=== Alternative ===
Let p be an odd prime and H a finite group. Then H is p-stable if $F^*(H)=O_p(H)$ and, whenever P is a normal p-subgroup of H and $g \in H$ with $[P,g,g]=1$, then $gC_H(P)\in O_p(H/C_H(P))$.

== Properties ==
If p is an odd prime and G is a finite group such that SL_{2}(p) is not involved in G, then G is p-stable. If furthermore G contains a normal p-subgroup P such that $C_G(P)\leqslant P$, then $Z(J_0(S))$ is a characteristic subgroup of G, where $J_0(S)$ is the subgroup introduced by John Thompson in (Thompson 1969, pp. 149–151).

== See also ==
- p-stability is used as one of the conditions in Glauberman's ZJ theorem.
- Quadratic pair
- p-constrained group
- p-solvable group
