= ZJ theorem =

In mathematics, George Glauberman's ZJ theorem states that if a finite group G is p-constrained and p-stable and has a normal p-subgroup for some odd prime p, then O_{p′}(G)Z(J(S)) is a normal subgroup of G, for any Sylow p-subgroup S.

== Notation and definitions ==
- J(S) is the Thompson subgroup of a p-group S: the subgroup generated by the abelian subgroups of maximal order.
- Z(H) means the center of a group H.
- O_{p′} is the maximal normal subgroup of G of order coprime to p, the p′-core
- O_{p} is the maximal normal p-subgroup of G, the p-core.
- O_{p′,p}(G) is the maximal normal p-nilpotent subgroup of G, the p′,p-core, part of the upper p-series.
- For an odd prime p, a group G with O_{p}(G) ≠ 1 is said to be p-stable if whenever P is a p-subgroup of G such that PO_{p′}(G) is normal in G, and [P,x,x] = 1, then the image of x in N_{G}(P)/C_{G}(P) is contained in a normal p-subgroup of N_{G}(P)/C_{G}(P).
- For an odd prime p, a group G with O_{p}(G) ≠ 1 is said to be p-constrained if the centralizer C_{G}(P) is contained in O_{p′,p}(G) whenever P is a Sylow p-subgroup of O_{p′,p}(G).
