= Clifford algebra =

Algebra based on a vector space with a quadratic form

In mathematics, a Clifford algebra (Note: Also known as a geometric algebra (especially over the real numbers)) is an algebra generated by a vector space with a quadratic form, and is a unital associative algebra with the additional structure of a distinguished subspace. As K-algebras, they generalize the real numbers, complex numbers, quaternions and several other hypercomplex number systems. The theory of Clifford algebras is intimately connected with the theory of quadratic forms and orthogonal transformations. Clifford algebras have important applications in a variety of fields including geometry, theoretical physics and digital image processing. They are named after the English mathematician William Kingdon Clifford (1845–1879).

The most familiar Clifford algebras, the orthogonal Clifford algebras, are also referred to as (pseudo-)Riemannian Clifford algebras, as distinct from symplectic Clifford algebras. (Note: See for ex. Oziewicz & Sitarczyk 1992)

== Introduction and basic properties ==
A Clifford algebra is a unital associative algebra that contains and is generated by a vector space V over a field K, where V is equipped with a quadratic form Q : V → K. The Clifford algebra Cl(V, Q) is the "freest" unital associative algebra generated by V subject to the condition (Note: Mathematicians who work with real Clifford algebras and prefer positive definite quadratic forms (especially those working in index theory) sometimes use a different choice of sign in the fundamental Clifford identity. That is, they take v^{2} = −Q(v). One must replace Q with −Q in going from one convention to the other.)
$$v^2 = Q(v)1\ \forall\ v\in V,$$
where the product on the left is that of the algebra, and the 1 on the right is the algebra's multiplicative identity (not to be confused with the multiplicative identity of K). The idea of being the "freest" or "most general" algebra subject to this identity can be formally expressed through the notion of a universal property, as done below.

When V is a finite-dimensional real vector space and Q is nondegenerate, Cl(V, Q) may be identified by the label Cl_{p,q}(R), indicating that V has an orthogonal basis with p elements with e_{i}^{2} = +1, q with e_{i}^{2} = −1, and where R indicates that this is a Clifford algebra over the reals; i.e. coefficients of elements of the algebra are real numbers. Such a basis may be found by orthogonal diagonalization.

The free algebra generated by V may be written as the tensor algebra ⨁_{n≥0} V ⊗ ⋯ ⊗ V, that is, the direct sum of the tensor product of n copies of V over all n. Therefore one obtains a Clifford algebra as the quotient of this tensor algebra by the two-sided ideal generated by elements of the form v ⊗ v − Q(v)1 for all elements v ∈ V. The product induced by the tensor product in the quotient algebra is written using juxtaposition (e.g. uv). Its associativity follows from the associativity of the tensor product.

The Clifford algebra has a distinguished subspace V, being the image of the embedding map. Such a subspace cannot in general be uniquely determined given only a K-algebra that is isomorphic to the Clifford algebra.

If 2 is invertible in the ground field K, then one can rewrite the fundamental identity above in the form
$$uv + vu = 2\langle u, v\rangle1\ \text{ for all } u,v \in V,$$
where
$$\langle u, v \rangle = \frac{1}{2} \left( Q(u + v) - Q(u) - Q(v) \right)$$
is the symmetric bilinear form associated with Q, via the polarization identity.

Quadratic forms and Clifford algebras in characteristic 2 form an exceptional case in this respect. In particular, if char(K) = 2 it is not true that a quadratic form necessarily or uniquely determines a symmetric bilinear form that satisfies Q(v) = ⟨v, v⟩, Many of the statements in this article include the condition that the characteristic is not 2, and are false if this condition is removed.

=== As a quantization of the exterior algebra ===
Clifford algebras are closely related to exterior algebras. Indeed, if Q = 0 then the Clifford algebra Cl(V, Q) is just the exterior algebra ⋀V. Whenever 2 is invertible in the ground field K, there exists a canonical linear isomorphism between ⋀V and Cl(V, Q). That is, they are naturally isomorphic as vector spaces, but with different multiplications (in the case of characteristic two, they are still isomorphic as vector spaces, just not naturally). Clifford multiplication together with the distinguished subspace is strictly richer than the exterior product since it makes use of the extra information provided by Q.

The Clifford algebra is a filtered algebra; the associated graded algebra is the exterior algebra.

More precisely, Clifford algebras may be thought of as quantizations (cf. quantum group) of the exterior algebra, in the same way that the Weyl algebra is a quantization of the symmetric algebra.

Weyl algebras and Clifford algebras admit a further structure of a *-algebra, and can be unified as even and odd terms of a superalgebra, as discussed in CCR and CAR algebras.

== Universal property and construction ==
Let V be a vector space over a field K, and let Q : V → K be a quadratic form on V. In most cases of interest the field K is either the field of real numbers R, or the field of complex numbers C, or a finite field.

A Clifford algebra Cl(V, Q) is a pair (B, i), (Note: Vaz & da Rocha 2016 make it clear that the map i (γ in the quote here) is included in the structure of a Clifford algebra by defining it as "The pair (A, γ) is a Clifford algebra for the quadratic space (V, g) when A is generated as an algebra by { γ(v) | v ∈ V } and { a1_{A} | a ∈ R }, and γ satisfies γ(v)γ(u) + γ(u)γ(v) = 2g(v, u) for all v, u ∈ V.") where B is a unital associative algebra over K and i is a linear map i : V → B that satisfies i(v)^{2} = Q(v)1_{B} for all v in V, defined by the following universal property: given any unital associative algebra A over K and any linear map j : V → A such that
$$j(v)^2 = Q(v)1_A \text{ for all } v \in V$$
(where 1_{A} denotes the multiplicative identity of A), there is a unique algebra homomorphism f : B → A such that the following diagram commutes (i.e. such that f ∘ i = j):

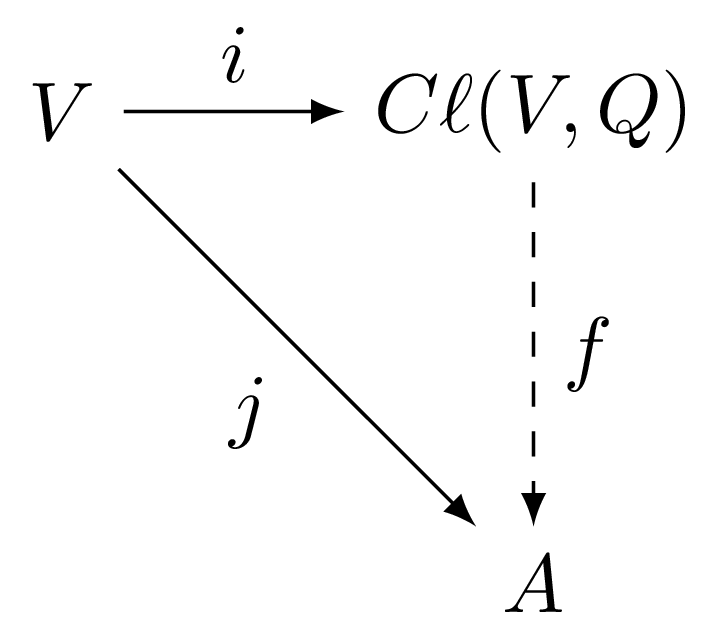
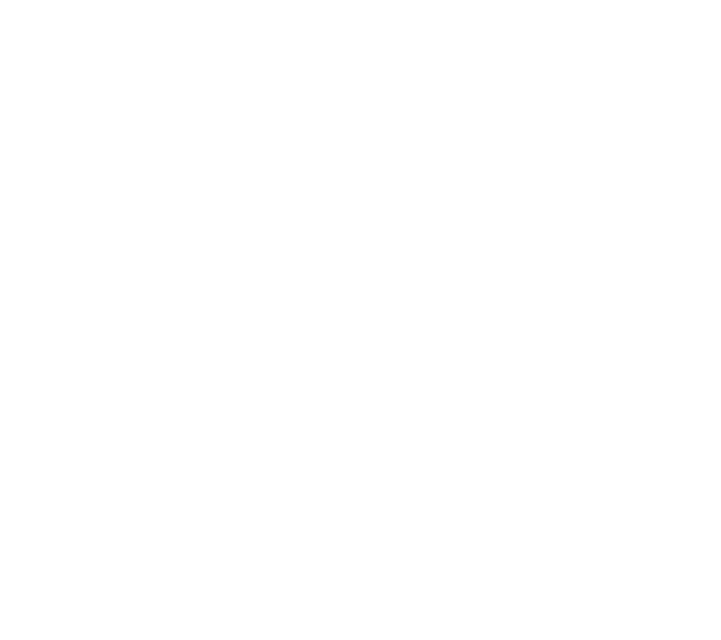

The quadratic form Q may be replaced by a (not necessarily symmetric) bilinear form ⟨⋅,⋅⟩ that has the property ⟨v, v⟩ = Q(v), v ∈ V, in which case an equivalent requirement on j is
$$j(v)j(v) = \langle v, v \rangle 1_A \quad \text{ for all } v \in V .$$

When the characteristic of the field is not 2, this may be replaced by what is then an equivalent requirement,
$$j(v)j(w) + j(w)j(v) = ( \langle v, w \rangle + \langle w, v \rangle )1_A \quad \text{ for all } v, w \in V ,$$
where the bilinear form may additionally be restricted to being symmetric without loss of generality.

A Clifford algebra as described above always exists and can be constructed as follows: start with the most general algebra that contains V, namely the tensor algebra T(V), and then enforce the fundamental identity by taking a suitable quotient. In our case we want to take the two-sided ideal I_{Q} in T(V) generated by all elements of the form
$$v\otimes v - Q(v)1$$
for all $v\in V$ and define Cl(V, Q) as the quotient algebra
$$\operatorname{Cl}(V, Q) = T(V) / I_Q .$$

The ring product inherited by this quotient is sometimes referred to as the Clifford product to distinguish it from the exterior product and the scalar product.

It is then straightforward to show that Cl(V, Q) contains V and satisfies the above universal property, so that Cl is unique up to a unique isomorphism; thus one speaks of "the" Clifford algebra Cl(V, Q). It also follows from this construction that i is injective. One usually drops the i and considers V as a linear subspace of Cl(V, Q).

The universal characterization of the Clifford algebra shows that the construction of Cl(V, Q) is functorial in nature. Namely, Cl can be considered as a functor from the category of vector spaces with quadratic forms (whose morphisms are linear maps that preserve the quadratic form) to the category of associative algebras. The universal property guarantees that linear maps between vector spaces (that preserve the quadratic form) extend uniquely to algebra homomorphisms between the associated Clifford algebras.

== Basis and dimension ==
Since V comes equipped with a quadratic form Q, in characteristic not equal to 2 there exist bases for V that are orthogonal. An orthogonal basis is one such that for a symmetric bilinear form
$$\langle e_i, e_j \rangle = 0$$
for $i\neq j$, and
$$\langle e_i, e_i \rangle = Q(e_i).$$

The fundamental Clifford identity implies that for an orthogonal basis
$$e_i e_j = -e_j e_i$$
for $i \neq j$, and
$$e_i^2 = Q(e_i).$$

This makes manipulation of orthogonal basis vectors quite simple. Given a product $e_{i_1}e_{i_2}\cdots e_{i_k}$ of distinct orthogonal basis vectors of V, one can put them into a standard order while including an overall sign determined by the number of pairwise swaps needed to do so (i.e. the signature of the ordering permutation).

If the dimension of V over K is n and {e_{1}, ..., e_{n}} is an orthogonal basis of (V, Q), then Cl(V, Q) is free over K with a basis
$$\{e_{i_1}e_{i_2}\cdots e_{i_k} \mid 1\le i_1 < i_2 < \cdots < i_k \le n\text{ and } 0\le k\le n\}.$$

The empty product (k = 0) is defined as being the multiplicative identity element. For each value of k there are n choose k basis elements, so the total dimension of the Clifford algebra is
$$\dim \operatorname{Cl}(V, Q) = \sum_{k=0}^n \binom{n}{k} = 2^n.$$

== Examples: real and complex Clifford algebras ==
The most important Clifford algebras are those over real and complex vector spaces equipped with nondegenerate quadratic forms.

Each of the algebras Cl_{p,q}(R) and Cl_{n}(C) is isomorphic to A or A ⊕ A, where A is a full matrix ring with entries from R, C, or H. For a complete classification of these algebras see Classification of Clifford algebras.

=== Real numbers ===
Clifford algebras are also sometimes referred to as geometric algebras, most often over the real numbers.

Every nondegenerate quadratic form on a finite-dimensional real vector space is equivalent to the standard diagonal form:
$$Q(v) = v_1^2 + \dots + v_p^2 - v_{p+1}^2 - \dots - v_{p+q}^2 ,$$
where n = p + q is the dimension of the vector space. The pair of integers (p, q) is called the signature of the quadratic form. The real vector space with this quadratic form is often denoted R^{p,q}. The Clifford algebra on R^{p,q} is denoted Cl_{p,q}(R). The symbol Cl_{n}(R) means either Cl_{n,0}(R) or Cl_{0,n}(R), depending on whether the author prefers positive-definite or negative-definite spaces.

A standard basis {e_{1}, ..., e_{n}} for R^{p,q} consists of n = p + q mutually orthogonal vectors, p of which square to +1 and q of which square to −1. Of such a basis, the algebra Cl_{p,q}(R) will therefore have p vectors that square to +1 and q vectors that square to −1.

A few low-dimensional cases are:

- Cl_{0,0}(R) is naturally isomorphic to R since there are no nonzero vectors.
- Cl_{0,1}(R) is a two-dimensional algebra generated by e_{1} that squares to −1, and is algebra-isomorphic to C, the field of complex numbers.
- Cl_{1,0}(R) is a two-dimensional algebra generated by e_{1} that squares to 1, and is algebra-isomorphic to the split-complex numbers.
- Cl_{0,2}(R) is a four-dimensional algebra spanned by {1, e_{1}, e_{2}, e_{1}e_{2}}. The latter three elements all square to −1 and anticommute, and so the algebra is isomorphic to the quaternions H.
- Cl_{2,0}(R) ≅ Cl_{1,1}(R) is isomorphic to the algebra of split-quaternions.
- Cl_{0,3}(R) is an 8-dimensional algebra isomorphic to the direct sum H ⊕ H, the split-biquaternions.
- Cl_{3,0}(R) ≅ Cl_{1,2}(R) is isomorphic to the algebra of biquaternions and to the Pauli algebra.

=== Complex numbers ===
One can also study Clifford algebras on complex vector spaces. Every nondegenerate quadratic form on a complex vector space of dimension n is equivalent to the standard diagonal form
$$Q(z) = z_1^2 + z_2^2 + \dots + z_n^2.$$
Thus, for each dimension n, up to isomorphism there is only one Clifford algebra of a complex vector space with a nondegenerate quadratic form. We will denote the Clifford algebra on C^{n} with the standard quadratic form by Cl_{n}(C).

For the first few cases one finds that

- Cl_{0}(C) ≅ C, the complex numbers
- Cl_{1}(C) ≅ C ⊕ C, the bicomplex numbers
- Cl_{2}(C) ≅ M_{2}(C), the biquaternions

where M_{n}(C) denotes the algebra of n × n matrices over C.

== Examples: constructing quaternions and dual quaternions ==
=== Quaternions ===
In this section, Hamilton's quaternions are constructed as the even subalgebra of the Clifford algebra Cl_{3,0}(R).

Let the vector space V be real three-dimensional space R^{3}, and the quadratic form be Euclidean. Then, for v, w in R^{3} we have the bilinear form (or scalar product)
$$v \cdot w = v_1 w_1 + v_2 w_2 + v_3 w_3.$$
Now introduce the Clifford product of vectors v and w given by
$$v w + w v = 2 (v \cdot w) .$$

Denote a set of orthogonal unit vectors of R^{3} as {e_{1}, e_{2}, e_{3}}, then the Clifford product yields the relations
$$e_2 e_3 = -e_3 e_2, \,\,\,  e_1 e_3 = -e_3 e_1,\,\,\,  e_1 e_2 = -e_2 e_1,$$
and
$$e_1 ^2 = e_2^2 = e_3^2 = 1.$$
The general element of the Clifford algebra Cl_{3,0}(R) is given by
$$A = a_0 + a_1 e_1 + a_2 e_2 + a_3 e_3 + a_4 e_2 e_3 + a_5 e_1 e_3 + a_6 e_1 e_2 + a_7 e_1 e_2 e_3.$$

The linear combination of the even degree elements of Cl_{3,0}(R) defines the even subalgebra Cl^{[0]}_{3,0}(R) with the general element
$$q = q_0 + q_1 e_2 e_3 + q_2 e_1 e_3 + q_3 e_1 e_2.$$
The basis elements can be identified with the quaternion basis elements i, j, k as
$$i=  e_2 e_3, j =  e_1 e_3, k =  e_1 e_2,$$
which shows that the even subalgebra Cl^{[0]}_{3,0}(R) is Hamilton's real quaternion algebra.

To see this, compute
$$i^2 = (e_2 e_3)^2 = e_2 e_3 e_2 e_3 = - e_2 e_2 e_3 e_3 = -1,$$
and
$$ij = e_2 e_3 e_1 e_3 = -e_2 e_3 e_3 e_1 = -e_2 e_1 = e_1 e_2 = k.$$
Finally,
$$ijk = e_2 e_3 e_1 e_3 e_1 e_2 = -1.$$

=== Dual quaternions ===
In this section, dual quaternions are constructed as the even subalgebra of a Clifford algebra of real four-dimensional space with a degenerate quadratic form.

Let the vector space V be real four-dimensional space R^{4}, and let the quadratic form Q be a degenerate form derived from the Euclidean metric on R^{3}. For v, w in R^{4} introduce the degenerate bilinear form
$$d(v, w) = v_1 w_1 + v_2 w_2 + v_3 w_3 .$$
This degenerate scalar product projects distance measurements in R^{4} onto the R^{3} hyperplane.

The Clifford product of vectors v and w is given by
$$v w + w v = -2 \,d(v, w).$$
Note the negative sign is introduced to simplify the correspondence with quaternions.

Denote a set of mutually orthogonal unit vectors of R^{4} as {e_{1}, e_{2}, e_{3}, e_{4}}, then the Clifford product yields the relations
$$e_m e_n = -e_n e_m, \,\,\,  m \ne n,$$
and
$$e_1 ^2 = e_2^2 = e_3^2 = -1, \,\, e_4^2 = 0.$$

The general element of the Clifford algebra Cl(R^{4}, d) has 16 components. The linear combination of the even degree elements defines the even subalgebra Cl^{[0]}(R^{4}, d) with the general element
$$H = h_0 + h_1 e_2 e_3 + h_2 e_3 e_1 + h_3 e_1 e_2 + h_4 e_4 e_1 + h_5 e_4 e_2 + h_6 e_4 e_3 + h_7 e_1 e_2 e_3 e_4.$$

The basis elements can be identified with the quaternion basis elements i, j, k and the dual unit ε as
$$i = e_2 e_3, j = e_3 e_1, k = e_1 e_2, \,\, \varepsilon = e_1 e_2 e_3 e_4.$$
This provides the correspondence of Cl^{[0]}_{0,3,1}(R) with dual quaternion algebra.

To see this, compute
$$\varepsilon ^2 = (e_1 e_2 e_3 e_4)^2 =  e_1 e_2 e_3 e_4 e_1 e_2 e_3 e_4 = -e_1 e_2 e_3 (e_4 e_4 ) e_1 e_2 e_3 = 0 ,$$
and
$$\varepsilon i = (e_1 e_2 e_3 e_4) e_2 e_3  = e_1 e_2 e_3 e_4 e_2 e_3 = e_2 e_3 (e_1 e_2 e_3 e_4) = i\varepsilon.$$
The exchanges of e_{1} and e_{4} alternate signs an even number of times, and show the dual unit ε commutes with the quaternion basis elements i, j, k.

== Examples: in small dimension ==
Let K be any field of characteristic not 2.

=== Dimension 1 ===
For dim V = 1, if Q has diagonalization diag(a), a non-zero vector x such that Q(x) = a, then Cl(V, Q) is algebra-isomorphic to a K-algebra generated by an element x that satisfies x^{2} = a, the quadratic algebra K[X] / (X^{2} − a).

In particular, if a = 0 (that is, Q is the zero quadratic form) then Cl(V, Q) is algebra-isomorphic to the dual numbers algebra over K.

If a is a non-zero square in K, then Cl(V, Q) ≃ K ⊕ K.

Otherwise, Cl(V, Q) is isomorphic to the quadratic field extension K(√a) of K.

=== Dimension 2 ===
For dim V = 2, if Q has diagonalization diag(a, b) with non-zero a and b (which always exists if Q is non-degenerate), then Cl(V, Q) is isomorphic to a K-algebra generated by elements x and y that satisfies x^{2} = a, y^{2} = b and xy = −yx.

Thus Cl(V, Q) is isomorphic to the (generalized) quaternion algebra (a, b)_{K}. We retrieve Hamilton's quaternions when a = b = −1, since H = (−1, −1)_{R}.

As a special case, if some x in V satisfies Q(x) = 1, then Cl(V, Q) ≃ M_{2}(K).

== Properties ==
=== Relation to the exterior algebra ===
Given a vector space V, one can construct the exterior algebra ⋀V, whose definition is independent of any quadratic form on V. It turns out that if K does not have characteristic 2 then there is a natural isomorphism between ⋀V and Cl(V, Q) considered as vector spaces (and there exists an isomorphism in characteristic two, which may not be natural). This is an algebra isomorphism if and only if Q = 0. One can thus consider the Clifford algebra Cl(V, Q) as an enrichment (or more precisely, a quantization, cf. the Introduction) of the exterior algebra on V with a multiplication that depends on Q (one can still define the exterior product independently of Q).

The easiest way to establish the isomorphism is to choose an orthogonal basis {e_{1}, ..., e_{n}} for V and extend it to a basis for Cl(V, Q) as described above. The map Cl(V, Q) → ⋀V is determined by
$$e_{i_1}e_{i_2} \cdots e_{i_k} \mapsto e_{i_1}\wedge e_{i_2}\wedge \cdots \wedge e_{i_k}.$$
Note that this works only if the basis {e_{1}, ..., e_{n}} is orthogonal. One can show that this map is independent of the choice of orthogonal basis and so gives a natural isomorphism.

If the characteristic of K is 0, one can also establish the isomorphism by antisymmetrizing. Define functions f_{k} : V × ⋯ × V → Cl(V, Q) by
$$f_k(v_1, \ldots, v_k) = \frac{1}{k!}\sum_{\sigma\in \mathrm{S}_k} \sgn(\sigma)\, v_{\sigma(1)}\cdots v_{\sigma(k)}$$
where the sum is taken over the symmetric group on k elements, S_{k}. Since f_{k} is alternating, it induces a unique linear map ⋀^{k} V → Cl(V, Q). The direct sum of these maps gives a linear map between ⋀V and Cl(V, Q). This map can be shown to be a linear isomorphism, and it is natural.

A more sophisticated way to view the relationship is to construct a filtration on Cl(V, Q). Recall that the tensor algebra T(V) has a natural filtration: F^{0} ⊂ F^{1} ⊂ F^{2} ⊂ ⋯, where F^{k} contains sums of tensors with order ≤ k. Projecting this down to the Clifford algebra gives a filtration on Cl(V, Q). The associated graded algebra
$$\operatorname{Gr}_F \operatorname{Cl}(V,Q) = \bigoplus_k F^k/F^{k-1}$$
is naturally isomorphic to the exterior algebra ⋀V. Since the associated graded algebra of a filtered algebra is always isomorphic to the filtered algebra as filtered vector spaces (by choosing complements of F^{k} in F^{k+1} for all k), this provides an isomorphism (although not a natural one) in any characteristic, even two.

=== Grading ===
In the following, assume that the characteristic is not 2. (Note: Thus the group algebra K[Z/2Z] is semisimple and the Clifford algebra splits into eigenspaces of the main involution.)

Clifford algebras are Z_{2}-graded algebras (also known as superalgebras). Indeed, the linear map on V defined by v ↦ −v (reflection through the origin) preserves the quadratic form Q and so by the universal property of Clifford algebras extends to an algebra automorphism
$$\alpha: \operatorname{Cl}(V, Q) \to \operatorname{Cl}(V, Q).$$

Since α is an involution (i.e. it squares to the identity) one can decompose Cl(V, Q) into positive and negative eigenspaces of α
$$\operatorname{Cl}(V, Q) = \operatorname{Cl}^{[0]}(V, Q) \oplus \operatorname{Cl}^{[1]}(V, Q)$$
where
$$\operatorname{Cl}^{[i]}(V, Q) = \left\{ x \in \operatorname{Cl}(V, Q) \mid \alpha(x) = (-1)^i x \right\}.$$

Since α is an automorphism it follows that:
$$\operatorname{Cl}^{[i]}(V, Q)\operatorname{Cl}^{[j]}(V, Q) = \operatorname{Cl}^{[i+j]}(V, Q)$$
where the bracketed superscripts are read modulo 2. This gives Cl(V, Q) the structure of a Z_{2}-graded algebra. The subspace Cl^{[0]}(V, Q) forms a subalgebra of Cl(V, Q), called the even subalgebra. The subspace Cl^{[1]}(V, Q) is called the odd part of Cl(V, Q) (it is not a subalgebra). This Z_{2}-grading plays an important role in the analysis and application of Clifford algebras. The automorphism α is called the main involution or grade involution. Elements that are pure in this Z_{2}-grading are simply said to be even or odd.

Remark. The Clifford algebra is not a Z-graded algebra, but is Z-filtered, where Cl^{≤i}(V, Q) is the subspace spanned by all products of at most i elements of V.
$$\operatorname{Cl}^{\leqslant i}(V, Q) \cdot \operatorname{Cl}^{\leqslant j}(V, Q) \subset \operatorname{Cl}^{\leqslant i+j}(V, Q).$$

The degree of a Clifford number usually refers to the degree in the Z-grading.

The even subalgebra Cl^{[0]}(V, Q) of a Clifford algebra is itself isomorphic to a Clifford algebra. (Note: Technically, it does not have the full structure of a Clifford algebra without a designated vector subspace, and so is isomorphic as an algebra, but not as a Clifford algebra.) (Note: We are still assuming that the characteristic is not 2.) If V is the orthogonal direct sum of a vector a of nonzero norm Q(a) and a subspace U, then Cl^{[0]}(V, Q) is isomorphic to Cl(U, −Q(a)Q|_{U}), where Q|_{U} is the form Q restricted to U. In particular over the reals this implies that:
$$\operatorname{Cl}_{p,q}^{[0]}(\mathbf{R}) \cong \begin{cases}
\operatorname{Cl}_{p,q-1}(\mathbf{R}) & q > 0 \\
\operatorname{Cl}_{q,p-1}(\mathbf{R}) & p > 0
\end{cases}$$

In the negative-definite case this gives an inclusion Cl_{0,n−1}(R) ⊂ Cl_{0,n}(R), which extends the sequence

R ⊂ C ⊂ H ⊂ H ⊕ H ⊂ ⋯

Likewise, in the complex case, one can show that the even subalgebra of Cl_{n}(C) is isomorphic to Cl_{n−1}(C).

=== Antiautomorphisms ===
In addition to the automorphism α, there are two antiautomorphisms that play an important role in the analysis of Clifford algebras. Recall that the tensor algebra T(V) comes with an antiautomorphism that reverses the order in all products of vectors:
$$v_1\otimes v_2\otimes \cdots \otimes v_k \mapsto v_k\otimes \cdots \otimes v_2\otimes v_1.$$
Since the ideal I_{Q} is invariant under this reversal, this operation descends to an antiautomorphism of Cl(V, Q) called the transpose or reversal operation, denoted by x^{t}. The transpose is an antiautomorphism: (xy)^{t} = y^{t} x^{t}. The transpose operation makes no use of the Z_{2}-grading so we define a second antiautomorphism by composing α and the transpose. We call this operation Clifford conjugation denoted $\bar x$
$$\bar x = \alpha(x^\mathrm{t}) = \alpha(x)^\mathrm{t}.$$
Of the two antiautomorphisms, the transpose is the more fundamental. (Note: The opposite is true when using the alternate (−) sign convention for Clifford algebras: it is the conjugate that is more important. In general, the meanings of conjugation and transpose are interchanged when passing from one sign convention to the other. For example, in the convention used here the inverse of a vector is given by v^{−1} = v^{t} / Q(v) while in the (−) convention it is given by v^{−1} = v̅ / Q(v).)

Note that all of these operations are involutions. One can show that they act as ±1 on elements that are pure in the Z-grading. In fact, all three operations depend on only the degree modulo 4. That is, if x is pure with degree k then
$$\alpha(x) = \pm x \qquad x^\mathrm{t} = \pm x \qquad \bar x = \pm x$$
where the signs are given by the following table:

k mod 4	0	1	2	3	...
$\alpha(x)\,$	+	−	+	−	(−1)^{k}
$x^\mathrm{t}\,$	+	+	−	−	(−1)^{k(k−1)/2}
$\bar x$	+	−	−	+	(−1)^{k(k+1)/2}

=== Clifford scalar product ===
When the characteristic is not 2, the quadratic form Q on V can be extended to a quadratic form on all of Cl(V, Q) (which we also denoted by Q). A basis-independent definition of one such extension is
$$Q(x) = \left\langle x^\mathrm{t} x\right\rangle_0$$
where ⟨a⟩_{0} denotes the scalar part of a (the degree-0 part in the Z-grading). One can show that
$$Q(v_1v_2 \cdots v_k) = Q(v_1)Q(v_2) \cdots Q(v_k)$$
where the v_{i} are elements of V – this identity is not true for arbitrary elements of Cl(V, Q).

The associated symmetric bilinear form on Cl(V, Q) is given by
$$\langle x, y\rangle = \left\langle x^\mathrm{t} y\right\rangle_0.$$
One can check that this reduces to the original bilinear form when restricted to V. The bilinear form on all of Cl(V, Q) is nondegenerate if and only if it is nondegenerate on V.

The operator of left (respectively right) Clifford multiplication by the transpose a^{t} of an element a is the adjoint of left (respectively right) Clifford multiplication by a with respect to this inner product. That is,
$$\langle ax, y\rangle = \left\langle x, a^\mathrm{t} y\right\rangle,$$
and
$$\langle xa, y\rangle = \left\langle x, y a^\mathrm{t}\right\rangle.$$

== Structure of Clifford algebras ==
In this section we assume that characteristic is not 2, the vector space V is finite-dimensional and that the associated symmetric bilinear form of Q is nondegenerate.

A central simple algebra over K is a matrix algebra over a (finite-dimensional) division algebra with center K. For example, the central simple algebras over the reals are matrix algebras over either the reals or the quaternions.

- If V has even dimension then Cl(V, Q) is a central simple algebra over K.
- If V has even dimension then the even subalgebra Cl^{[0]}(V, Q) is a central simple algebra over a quadratic extension of K or a sum of two isomorphic central simple algebras over K.
- If V has odd dimension then Cl(V, Q) is a central simple algebra over a quadratic extension of K or a sum of two isomorphic central simple algebras over K.
- If V has odd dimension then the even subalgebra Cl^{[0]}(V, Q) is a central simple algebra over K.

The structure of Clifford algebras can be worked out explicitly using the following result. Suppose that U has even dimension and a non-singular bilinear form with discriminant d, and suppose that V is another vector space with a quadratic form. The Clifford algebra of U + V is isomorphic to the tensor product of the Clifford algebras of U and (−1)^{dim(U)/2}dV, which is the space V with its quadratic form multiplied by (−1)^{dim(U)/2}d. Over the reals, this implies in particular that
$$\operatorname{Cl}_{p+2,q}(\mathbf{R}) \cong \mathrm{M}_2(\mathbf{R})\otimes \operatorname{Cl}_{q,p}(\mathbf{R})$$
$$\operatorname{Cl}_{p+1,q+1}(\mathbf{R}) \cong \mathrm{M}_2(\mathbf{R})\otimes \operatorname{Cl}_{p,q}(\mathbf{R})$$
$$\operatorname{Cl}_{p,q+2}(\mathbf{R}) \cong \mathbf{H}\otimes \operatorname{Cl}_{q,p}(\mathbf{R}).$$
These formulas can be used to find the structure of all real Clifford algebras and all complex Clifford algebras; see the classification of Clifford algebras.

Notably, the Morita equivalence class of a Clifford algebra (its representation theory: the equivalence class of the category of modules over it) depends on only the signature (p − q) mod 8. This is an algebraic form of Bott periodicity.

== Lipschitz group ==
The class of Lipschitz groups (a.k.a. Clifford groups or Clifford–Lipschitz groups) was discovered by Rudolf Lipschitz.

In this section we assume that V is finite-dimensional and the quadratic form Q is nondegenerate.

An action on the elements of a Clifford algebra by its group of units may be defined in terms of a twisted conjugation: twisted conjugation by x maps y ↦ α(x) y x^{−1}, where α is the main involution defined above.

The Lipschitz group Γ is defined to be the set of invertible elements x that stabilize the set of vectors under this action, meaning that for all v in V we have:
$$\alpha(x) v x^{-1}\in V .$$

This formula also defines an action of the Lipschitz group on the vector space V that preserves the quadratic form Q, and so gives a homomorphism from the Lipschitz group to the orthogonal group. The Lipschitz group contains all elements r of V for which Q(r) is invertible in K, and these act on V by the corresponding reflections that take v to v − (⟨r, v⟩ + ⟨v, r⟩)r/Q(r). (In characteristic 2 these are called orthogonal transvections rather than reflections.)

If V is a finite-dimensional vector space with a non-degenerate quadratic form then the Lipschitz group maps onto the orthogonal group of V with respect to the form (by the Cartan–Dieudonné theorem) and the kernel consists of the nonzero elements of the field K. This leads to exact sequences
$$1 \rightarrow K^\times \rightarrow \Gamma \rightarrow \operatorname{O}_V(K) \rightarrow 1,$$
$$1 \rightarrow K^\times \rightarrow \Gamma^0 \rightarrow \operatorname{SO}_V(K) \rightarrow 1.$$

Over other fields or with indefinite forms, the map is not in general onto, and the failure is captured by the spinor norm.

=== Spinor norm ===
In arbitrary characteristic, the spinor norm Q is defined on the Lipschitz group by
$$Q(x) = x^\mathrm{t}x.$$
It is a homomorphism from the Lipschitz group to the group K^{×} of non-zero elements of K. It coincides with the quadratic form Q of V when V is identified with a subspace of the Clifford algebra. Several authors define the spinor norm slightly differently, so that it differs from the one here by a factor of −1, 2, or −2 on Γ^{1}. The difference is not very important in characteristic other than 2.

The nonzero elements of K have spinor norm in the group (K^{×})^{2} of squares of nonzero elements of the field K. So when V is finite-dimensional and non-singular we get an induced map from the orthogonal group of V to the group K^{×}/(K^{×})^{2}, also called the spinor norm. The spinor norm of the reflection about r^{⊥}, for any vector r, has image Q(r) in K^{×}/(K^{×})^{2}, and this property uniquely defines it on the orthogonal group. This gives exact sequences:
$$\begin{align}
1 \to \{\pm 1\} \to \operatorname{Pin}_V(K)  &\to \operatorname{O}_V(K)  \to K^\times/\left(K^\times\right)^2, \\
1 \to \{\pm 1\} \to \operatorname{Spin}_V(K) &\to \operatorname{SO}_V(K) \to K^\times/\left(K^\times\right)^2.
\end{align}$$

Note that in characteristic 2 the group {±1} has just one element.

From the point of view of Galois cohomology of algebraic groups, the spinor norm is a connecting homomorphism on cohomology. Writing μ_{2} for the algebraic group of square roots of 1 (over a field of characteristic not 2 it is roughly the same as a two-element group with trivial Galois action), the short exact sequence
$$1 \to \mu_2 \rightarrow \operatorname{Pin}_V \rightarrow \operatorname{O}_V \rightarrow 1$$
yields a long exact sequence on cohomology, which begins
$$1 \to H^0(\mu_2; K) \to H^0(\operatorname{Pin}_V; K) \to H^0(\operatorname{O}_V; K) \to H^1(\mu_2; K).$$

The 0th Galois cohomology group of an algebraic group with coefficients in K is just the group of K-valued points: H^{0}(G; K) = G(K), and H^{1}(μ_{2}; K) ≅ K^{×}/(K^{×})^{2}, which recovers the previous sequence
$$1 \to \{\pm 1\} \to \operatorname{Pin}_V(K) \to \operatorname{O}_V(K)  \to K^\times/\left(K^\times\right)^2,$$
where the spinor norm is the connecting homomorphism H^{0}(O_{V}; K) → H^{1}(μ_{2}; K).

== Spin and pin groups ==
In this section we assume that V is finite-dimensional and its bilinear form is non-singular.

The pin group Pin_{V}(K) is the subgroup of the Lipschitz group Γ of elements of spinor norm 1, and similarly the spin group Spin_{V}(K) is the subgroup of elements of Dickson invariant 0 in Pin_{V}(K). When the characteristic is not 2, these are the elements of determinant 1. The spin group usually has index 2 in the pin group.

Recall from the previous section that there is a homomorphism from the Lipschitz group onto the orthogonal group. We define the special orthogonal group to be the image of Γ^{0}. If K does not have characteristic 2 this is just the group of elements of the orthogonal group of determinant 1. If K does have characteristic 2, then all elements of the orthogonal group have determinant 1, and the special orthogonal group is the set of elements of Dickson invariant 0.

There is a homomorphism from the pin group to the orthogonal group. The image consists of the elements of spinor norm 1 ∈ K^{×}/(K^{×})^{2}. The kernel consists of the elements +1 and −1, and has order 2 unless K has characteristic 2. Similarly there is a homomorphism from the Spin group to the special orthogonal group of V.

In the common case when V is a positive or negative definite space over the reals, the spin group maps onto the special orthogonal group, and is simply connected when V has dimension at least 3. Further the kernel of this homomorphism consists of 1 and −1. So in this case the spin group, Spin(n), is a double cover of SO(n). Note, however, that the simple connectedness of the spin group is not true in general: if V is R^{p,q} for p and q both at least 2 then the spin group is not simply connected. In this case the algebraic group Spin_{p,q} is simply connected as an algebraic group, even though its group of real valued points Spin_{p,q}(R) is not simply connected. This is a rather subtle point, which completely confused the authors of at least one standard book about spin groups.

== Spinors ==
Clifford algebras Cl_{p,q}(C), with p + q = 2n even, are matrix algebras that have a complex representation of dimension 2^{n}. By restricting to the group Pin_{p,q}(R) we get a complex representation of the Pin group of the same dimension, called the spin representation. If we restrict this to the spin group Spin_{p,q}(R) then it splits as the sum of two half spin representations (or Weyl representations) of dimension 2^{n−1}.

If p + q = 2n + 1 is odd then the Clifford algebra Cl_{p,q}(C) is a sum of two matrix algebras, each of which has a representation of dimension 2^{n}, and these are also both representations of the pin group Pin_{p,q}(R). On restriction to the spin group Spin_{p,q}(R) these become isomorphic, so the spin group has a complex spinor representation of dimension 2^{n}.

More generally, spinor groups and pin groups over any field have similar representations whose exact structure depends on the structure of the corresponding Clifford algebras: whenever a Clifford algebra has a factor that is a matrix algebra over some division algebra, we get a corresponding representation of the pin and spin groups over that division algebra. For examples over the reals see the article on spinors.

=== Real spinors ===
To describe the real spin representations, one must know how the spin group sits inside its Clifford algebra. The pin group, Pin_{p,q} is the set of invertible elements in Cl_{p,q} that can be written as a product of unit vectors:
$$\mathrm{Pin}_{p,q} = \left\{v_1v_2 \cdots v_r \mid \forall i\, \|v_i\| = \pm 1\right\}.$$
Comparing with the above concrete realizations of the Clifford algebras, the pin group corresponds to the products of arbitrarily many reflections: it is a cover of the full orthogonal group O(p, q). The spin group consists of those elements of Pin_{p,q} that are products of an even number of unit vectors. Thus by the Cartan–Dieudonné theorem Spin is a cover of the group of proper rotations SO(p, q).

Let α : Cl → Cl be the automorphism that is given by the mapping v ↦ −v acting on pure vectors. Then in particular, Spin_{p,q} is the subgroup of Pin_{p,q} whose elements are fixed by α. Let
$$\operatorname{Cl}_{p,q}^{[0]} = \{ x\in \operatorname{Cl}_{p,q} \mid \alpha(x) = x\}.$$
(These are precisely the elements of even degree in Cl_{p,q}.) Then the spin group lies within Cl^{[0]}_{p,q}.

The irreducible representations of Cl_{p,q} restrict to give representations of the pin group. Conversely, since the pin group is generated by unit vectors, all of its irreducible representation are induced in this manner. Thus the two representations coincide. For the same reasons, the irreducible representations of the spin coincide with the irreducible representations of Cl^{[0]}_{p,q}.

To classify the pin representations, one need only appeal to the classification of Clifford algebras. To find the spin representations (which are representations of the even subalgebra), one can first make use of either of the isomorphisms (see above)
$$\operatorname{Cl}^{[0]}_{p,q} \approx \operatorname{Cl}_{p,q-1}, \text{ for } q > 0$$
$$\operatorname{Cl}^{[0]}_{p,q} \approx \operatorname{Cl}_{q,p-1}, \text{ for } p > 0$$
and realize a spin representation in signature (p, q) as a pin representation in either signature (p, q − 1) or (q, p − 1).

== Applications ==
=== Differential geometry ===
One of the principal applications of the exterior algebra is in differential geometry where it is used to define the bundle of differential forms on a smooth manifold. In the case of a (pseudo-)Riemannian manifold, the tangent spaces come equipped with a natural quadratic form induced by the metric. Thus, one can define a Clifford bundle in analogy with the exterior bundle. This has a number of important applications in Riemannian geometry. Perhaps more important is the link to a spin manifold, its associated spinor bundle and spin^{c} manifolds.

=== Physics ===
Clifford algebras have numerous important applications in physics. Physicists usually consider a Clifford algebra to be an algebra that has a basis that is generated by the matrices γ_{0}, ..., γ_{3}, called Dirac matrices, which have the property that
$$\gamma_i\gamma_j + \gamma_j\gamma_i = 2\eta_{ij} ,$$
where η is the matrix of a quadratic form of signature (1, 3) (or (3, 1) corresponding to the two equivalent choices of metric signature). These are exactly the defining relations for the Clifford algebra Cl_{1,3}(R), whose complexification is Cl_{1,3}(R)_{C}, which, by the classification of Clifford algebras, is isomorphic to the algebra of 4 × 4 complex matrices Cl_{4}(C) ≈ M_{4}(C). However, it is best to retain the notation Cl_{1,3}(R)_{C}, since any transformation that takes the bilinear form to the canonical form is not a Lorentz transformation of the underlying spacetime.

The Clifford algebra of spacetime used in physics thus has more structure than Cl_{4}(C). It has in addition a set of preferred transformations – Lorentz transformations. Whether complexification is necessary to begin with depends in part on conventions used and in part on how much one wants to incorporate straightforwardly, but complexification is most often necessary in quantum mechanics where the spin representation of the Lie algebra so(1, 3) sitting inside the Clifford algebra conventionally requires a complex Clifford algebra. For reference, the spin Lie algebra is given by
$$\begin{align}
\sigma^{\mu\nu}
&= -\frac{i}{4}\left[\gamma^\mu,\, \gamma^\nu\right], \\
\left[\sigma^{\mu\nu},\, \sigma^{\rho\tau}\right]
&= i\left(\eta^{\tau\mu}\sigma^{\rho\nu} + \eta^{\nu\tau}\sigma^{\mu\rho} - \eta^{\rho\mu}\sigma^{\tau\nu} - \eta^{\nu\rho} \sigma^{\mu\tau}\right).
\end{align}$$

This is in the (3, 1) convention, hence fits in Cl_{3,1}(R)_{C}.

The Dirac matrices were first written down by Paul Dirac when he was trying to write a relativistic first-order wave equation for the electron, and give an explicit isomorphism from the Clifford algebra to the algebra of complex matrices. The result was used to define the Dirac equation and introduce the Dirac operator. The entire Clifford algebra shows up in quantum field theory in the form of Dirac field bilinears.

The use of Clifford algebras to describe quantum theory has been advanced among others by Mario Schönberg, (Note: See the references to Schönberg's papers of 1956 and 1957 as described in section "The Grassmann–Schönberg algebra G_{n}" of Bolivar 2001) by David Hestenes in terms of geometric calculus, by David Bohm and Basil Hiley and co-workers in form of a hierarchy of Clifford algebras, and by Elio Conte et al.

=== Computer vision ===
Clifford algebras have been applied in the problem of action recognition and classification in computer vision. Rodriguez et al propose a Clifford embedding to generalize traditional MACH filters to video (3D spatiotemporal volume), and vector-valued data such as optical flow. Vector-valued data is analyzed using the Clifford Fourier Transform. Based on these vectors action filters are synthesized in the Clifford Fourier domain and recognition of actions is performed using Clifford correlation. The authors demonstrate the effectiveness of the Clifford embedding by recognizing actions typically performed in classic feature films and sports broadcast television.

== Generalizations ==
- While this article focuses on a Clifford algebra of a vector space over a field, the definition extends without change to a module over any unital, associative, commutative ring. (Note: See for ex. Oziewicz & Sitarczyk 1992)
- Clifford algebras may be generalized to a form of degree higher than quadratic over a vector space.

== See also ==
- Algebra of physical space
- Cayley–Dickson construction
- Classification of Clifford algebras
- Clifford analysis
- Clifford module
- Complex spin structure
- Dirac operator
- Exterior algebra
- Fierz identity
- Gamma matrices
- Generalized Clifford algebra
- Geometric algebra
- Higher-dimensional gamma matrices
- Hypercomplex number
- Octonion
- Paravector
- Quaternion
- Spin group
- Spin structure
- Spinor
- Spinor bundle
