= Thompson subgroup =

In finite group theory, a branch of mathematics, the Thompson subgroup $J(P)$ of a finite p-group P refers to one of several characteristic subgroups of P. John G. Thompson (1964) originally defined $J(P)$ to be the subgroup generated by the abelian subgroups of P of maximal rank. More often the Thompson subgroup $J(P)$ is defined to be the subgroup generated by the abelian subgroups of P of maximal order or the subgroup generated by the elementary abelian subgroups of P of maximal rank. In general these three subgroups can be different, though they are all called the Thompson subgroup and denoted by $J(P)$.

== See also ==
- Glauberman normal p-complement theorem
- ZJ theorem
- Puig subgroup, a subgroup analogous to the Thompson subgroup
