= Thompson factorization =

Mathematical theory

In finite group theory, a branch of mathematics, a Thompson factorization, introduced by Thompson (1966), is an expression of some finite groups as a product of two subgroups, usually normalizers or centralizers of p-subgroups for some prime p.
