= Normal p-complement =

Finite group

In group theory, a branch of mathematics, a normal p-complement of a finite group for a prime p is a normal subgroup of order coprime to p and index a power of p. In other words the group is a semidirect product of the normal p-complement and any Sylow p-subgroup. A group is called p-nilpotent if it has a normal p-complement.

== Cayley normal 2-complement theorem ==
Cayley showed that if the Sylow 2-subgroup of a group G is cyclic then the group has a normal 2-complement, which shows that the Sylow 2-subgroup of a simple group of even order cannot be cyclic.

== Burnside normal p-complement theorem ==
Burnside (1911, Theorem II, section 243) showed that if a Sylow p-subgroup of a group G is in the center of its normalizer then G has a normal p-complement. This implies that if p is the smallest prime dividing the order of a group G and the Sylow p-subgroup is cyclic, then G has a normal p-complement.

== Frobenius normal p-complement theorem ==
The Frobenius normal p-complement theorem is a strengthening of the Burnside normal p-complement theorem, which states that if the normalizer of every non-trivial subgroup of a Sylow p-subgroup of G has a normal p-complement, then so does G. More precisely, the following conditions are equivalent:

- G has a normal p-complement
- The normalizer of every non-trivial p-subgroup has a normal p-complement
- For every p-subgroup Q, the group N_{G}(Q)/C_{G}(Q) is a p-group.

== Thompson normal p-complement theorem ==
The Frobenius normal p-complement theorem shows that if every normalizer of a non-trivial subgroup of a Sylow p-subgroup has a normal p-complement then so does G. For applications it is often useful to have a stronger version where instead of using all non-trivial subgroups of a Sylow p-subgroup, one uses only the non-trivial characteristic subgroups. For odd primes p Thompson found such a strengthened criterion: in fact he did not need all characteristic subgroups, but only two special ones.

Thompson (1964) showed that if p is an odd prime and the groups N(J(P)) and C(Z(P)) both have normal p-complements for a Sylow P-subgroup of G, then G has a normal p-complement.

In particular if the normalizer of every nontrivial characteristic subgroup of P has a normal p-complement, then so does G. This consequence is sufficient for many applications.

The result fails for p = 2 as the simple group PSL_{2}(F_{7}) of order 168 is a counterexample.

Thompson (1960) gave a weaker version of this theorem.

== Glauberman normal p-complement theorem ==
Thompson's normal p-complement theorem used conditions on two particular characteristic subgroups of a Sylow p-subgroup. Glauberman improved this further by showing that one only needs to use one characteristic subgroup: the center of the Thompson subgroup.

Glauberman (1968) used his ZJ theorem to prove a normal p-complement theorem, that if p is an odd prime and the normalizer of Z(J(P)) has a normal p-complement, for P a Sylow p-subgroup of G, then so does G. Here Z stands for the center of a group and J for the Thompson subgroup.

The result fails for p = 2 as the simple group PSL_{2}(F_{7}) of order 168 is a counterexample.
