= Puig subgroup =

Characteristic subgroup in mathematical finite group theory

In finite group theory, a branch of mathematics, the Puig subgroup, introduced by Puig (1976), is a characteristic subgroup of a p-group analogous to the Thompson subgroup.

== Definition ==
If H is a subgroup of a group G, then L_{G}(H) is the subgroup of G generated by the abelian subgroups normalized by H.

The subgroups L_{n} of G are defined recursively by

- L_{0} is the trivial subgroup
- L_{n+1} = L_{G}(L_{n})

They have the property that

- L_{0} ⊆ L_{2} ⊆ L_{4}... ⊆ ...L_{5} ⊆ L_{3} ⊆ L_{1}

The Puig subgroup L(G) is the intersection of the subgroups L_{n} for n odd, and the subgroup L_{*}(G) is the union of the subgroups L_{n} for n even.

== Properties ==
Puig proved that if G is a (solvable) group of odd order, p is a prime, and S is a Sylow p-subgroup of G, and the p′-core of G is trivial, then the center Z(L(S)) of the Puig subgroup of S is a normal subgroup of G.
