= Thompson order formula =

In mathematical finite group theory, the Thompson order formula, introduced by John Griggs Thompson (Held 1969, p.279), gives a formula for the order of a finite group in terms of the centralizers of involutions, extending the results of Brauer & Fowler (1955).

== Statement ==
If a finite group G has exactly two conjugacy classes of involutions with representatives t and z, then the Thompson order formula (Aschbacher 2000, 45.6) (Suzuki 1986, 5.1.7) states

$$|G| = |C_g(z)| a(t) + |C_g(t)| a(z)$$

Here a(x) is the number of pairs (u,v) with u conjugate to t, v conjugate to z, and x in the subgroup generated by uv.

Harris (1972, 3.10) gives the following more complicated version of the Thompson order formula for the case when G has more than two conjugacy classes of involution.

$$|G| = C_G(t)C_G(z) \sum_x\frac{a(x)}{C_G(x)}$$

where t and z are non-conjugate involutions, the sum is over a set of representatives x for the conjugacy classes of involutions, and a(x) is the number of ordered pairs of involutions u,v such that u is conjugate to t, v is conjugate to z, and x is the involution in the subgroup generated by tz.

== Proof ==
The Thompson order formula can be rewritten as

$$\frac{|G|}{C_G(z)}\frac{|G|}{C_G(t)} = \sum_x a(x)\frac{|G|}{C_G(x)}$$

where as before the sum is over a set of representatives x for the classes of involutions. The left hand side is the number of pairs on involutions (u,v) with u conjugate to t, v conjugate to z. The right hand side counts these pairs in classes, depending the class of the involution in the cyclic group generated by uv. The key point is that uv has even order (as if it had odd order then u and v would be conjugate) and so the group it generates contains a unique involution x.
