= P-constrained group =

Type of finite group

In mathematics, a p-constrained group is a finite group resembling the centralizer of an element of prime order p in a group of Lie type over a finite field of characteristic p. They were introduced by Gorenstein and Walter (1964, p.169) in order to extend some of Thompson's results about odd groups to groups with dihedral Sylow 2-subgroups.

== Definition ==
If a group has trivial p′ core O_{p′}(G), then it is defined to be p-constrained if the p-core O_{p}(G) contains its centralizer, or in other words if its generalized Fitting subgroup is a p-group. More generally, if O_{p′}(G) is non-trivial, then G is called p-constrained if G/O_{p′}(G) is p-constrained.

All p-solvable groups are p-constrained.

== See also ==
- p-stable group
- The ZJ theorem has p-constraint as one of its conditions.
