= Orthogonal group =

Type of group in mathematics

In mathematics, the orthogonal group in dimension n, denoted O(n), is the group of distance-preserving transformations of a Euclidean space of dimension n that preserve a fixed point (the origin), where the group operation is given by composing transformations. The orthogonal group is sometimes called the general orthogonal group, by analogy with the general linear group. Equivalently, it is the group of n × n orthogonal matrices, where the group operation is given by matrix multiplication (an orthogonal matrix is a real matrix whose inverse equals its transpose). The orthogonal group is an algebraic group and a Lie group. It is compact.

The orthogonal group in dimension n has two connected components. The one that contains the identity element is a normal subgroup, called the special orthogonal group, and denoted SO(n). It consists of all orthogonal matrices of determinant 1. This group is also called the rotation group, since its elements are the rotations around the origin. In low dimension, these groups have been widely studied, see SO(2), SO(3) and SO(4). The other component consists of all orthogonal matrices of determinant −1. This component does not form a group, as the product of any two of its elements is of determinant 1, and therefore not an element of the component.

By extension, for any field F, an n × n matrix with entries in F such that its inverse equals its transpose is called an orthogonal matrix over F. The n × n orthogonal matrices form a subgroup, denoted O(n, F), of the general linear group GL(n, F); that is
$$\operatorname{O}(n, F) = \left\{Q \in \operatorname{GL}(n, F) \mid Q^\mathsf{T} Q = Q Q^\mathsf{T} = I \right\} .$$

More generally, given a non-degenerate symmetric bilinear form or quadratic form (Note: For base fields of characteristic not 2, the definition in terms of a symmetric bilinear form is equivalent to that in terms of a quadratic form, but in characteristic 2 these notions differ.) on a vector space over a field, the orthogonal group of the form is the group of invertible linear maps that preserve the form. The preceding orthogonal groups are the special case where, on some basis, the bilinear form is the dot product, or, equivalently, the quadratic form is the sum of the square of the coordinates.

All orthogonal groups are algebraic groups, since the condition of preserving a form can be expressed as an equality of matrices.

== Name ==
The name of "orthogonal group" originates from the following characterization of its elements. Given a Euclidean vector space E of dimension n, the elements of the orthogonal group O(n) are, up to a uniform scaling (homothety), the linear maps from E to E that map orthogonal vectors to orthogonal vectors.

== In Euclidean geometry ==
The orthogonal $\operatorname{O}(n)$ is the subgroup of the general linear group $\operatorname{GL}(n,\mathbb{R})$, consisting of all endomorphisms that preserve the Euclidean norm; that is, endomorphisms $g$ such that $\|g(x)\| = \|x\|.$

Let $\operatorname{E}(n)$ be the group of the Euclidean isometries of a Euclidean space $S$ of dimension $n$. This group does not depend on the choice of a particular space, since all Euclidean spaces of the same dimension are isomorphic. The stabilizer subgroup of a point $x\in S$ is the subgroup of the elements $g\in\operatorname{E}(n)$ such that $g(x)=x$. This stabilizer is (or, more exactly, is isomorphic to) $\operatorname{O}(n)$, since the choice of a point as an origin induces an isomorphism between the Euclidean space and its associated Euclidean vector space.

There is a natural group homomorphism $p$ from $\operatorname{E}(n)$ to $\operatorname{O}(n)$, which is defined by

$$p(g)(y-x) = g(y)-g(x),$$

where, as usual, the subtraction of two points denotes the translation vector that maps the second point to the first one. This is a well defined homomorphism, since a straightforward verification shows that, if two pairs of points have the same difference, the same is true for their images by $g$ (for details, see Affine space § Subtraction and Weyl's axioms).

The kernel of $p$ is the vector space of the translations. So, the translations form a normal subgroup of $\operatorname{E}(n)$, the stabilizers of two points are conjugate under the action of the translations, and all stabilizers are isomorphic to $\operatorname{O}(n)$.

Moreover, the Euclidean group is a semidirect product of $\operatorname{O}(n)$ and the group of translations. It follows that the study of the Euclidean group is essentially reduced to the study of $\operatorname{O}(n)$.

=== Special orthogonal group ===
By choosing an orthonormal basis of a Euclidean vector space, the orthogonal group can be identified with the group (under matrix multiplication) of orthogonal matrices, which are the matrices such that

$$Q Q^\mathsf{T} = I.$$

It follows from this equation that the square of the determinant of Q equals 1, and thus the determinant of Q is either 1 or −1. The orthogonal matrices with determinant 1 form a subgroup called the special orthogonal group, denoted SO(n), consisting of all direct isometries of O(n), which are those that preserve the orientation of the space.

SO(n) is a normal subgroup of O(n), as being the kernel of the determinant, which is a group homomorphism whose image is the multiplicative group {−1, +1}. This implies that the orthogonal group is an internal semidirect product of SO(n) and any subgroup formed with the identity and a reflection.

The group with two elements {±I} (where I is the identity matrix) is a normal subgroup and even a characteristic subgroup of O(n), and, if n is even, also of SO(n). If n is odd, O(n) is the internal direct product of SO(n) and {±I}.

The group SO(2) is abelian (whereas SO(n) is not abelian when n > 2). Its finite subgroups are the cyclic group C_{k} of k-fold rotations, for every positive integer k. All these groups are normal subgroups of O(2) and SO(2).

=== Canonical form ===
For any element of O(n) there is an orthogonal basis, where its matrix has the form

$$\begin{bmatrix}
\begin{matrix}
R_1 &        & \\
& \ddots & \\
&        & R_k
\end{matrix} & 0 \\
0 & \begin{matrix}
\pm 1 &        & \\
& \ddots & \\
&        & \pm 1
\end{matrix}\\
\end{bmatrix},$$

where there may be any number, including zero, of ±1's; and where the matrices R_{1}, ..., R_{k} are 2-by-2 rotation matrices, that is matrices of the form

$$\begin{bmatrix}a&-b\\b&a\end{bmatrix},$$

with a^{2} + b^{2} = 1.

This results from the spectral theorem by regrouping eigenvalues that are complex conjugate, and taking into account that the absolute values of the eigenvalues of an orthogonal matrix are all equal to 1.

The element belongs to SO(n) if and only if there are an even number of −1 on the diagonal. A pair of eigenvalues −1 can be identified with a rotation by π and a pair of eigenvalues +1 can be identified with a rotation by 0.

The special case of n = 3 is known as Euler's rotation theorem, which asserts that every (non-identity) element of SO(3) is a rotation about a unique axis–angle pair.

=== Reflections ===
Reflections are the elements of O(n) whose canonical form is

$$\begin{bmatrix}-1&0\\0&I\end{bmatrix},$$

where I is the (n − 1) × (n − 1) identity matrix, and the zeros denote row or column zero matrices. In other words, a reflection is a transformation that transforms the space in its mirror image with respect to a hyperplane.

In dimension two, every rotation can be decomposed into a product of two reflections. More precisely, a rotation of angle θ is the product of two reflections whose axes form an angle of θ / 2.

A product of up to n elementary reflections always suffices to generate any element of O(n). This results immediately from the above canonical form and the case of dimension two.

The Cartan–Dieudonné theorem is the generalization of this result to the orthogonal group of a nondegenerate quadratic form over a field of characteristic different from two.

The reflection through the origin (the map v ↦ −v) is an example of an element of O(n) that is not a product of fewer than n reflections.

=== Symmetry group of spheres ===
The orthogonal group O(n) is the symmetry group of the (n − 1)-sphere (for n = 3, this is just the sphere) and all objects with spherical symmetry, if the origin is chosen at the center.

The symmetry group of a circle is O(2). The orientation-preserving subgroup SO(2) is isomorphic (as a real Lie group) to the circle group, also known as U(1), the multiplicative group of the complex numbers of absolute value equal to one. This isomorphism sends the complex number exp(φ i) = cos(φ) + i sin(φ) of absolute value 1 to the special orthogonal matrix

$$\begin{bmatrix}
\cos(\varphi) & -\sin(\varphi) \\
\sin(\varphi) &  \cos(\varphi)
\end{bmatrix}.$$

In higher dimension, O(n) has a more complicated structure (in particular, SO(n) is no longer commutative). The topological structures of the n-sphere and O(n) are strongly correlated, and this correlation is widely used for studying both topological spaces.

== Group structure ==
The groups O(n) and SO(n) are real compact Lie groups of dimension n(n − 1) / 2. The group O(n) has two connected components, with SO(n) being the identity component, that is, the connected component containing the identity matrix.

=== As algebraic groups ===
The orthogonal group O(n) can be identified with the group of the matrices A such that A^{T}A = I. Since both members of this equation are symmetric matrices, this provides n(n + 1) / 2 equations that the entries of an orthogonal matrix must satisfy, and which are not all satisfied by the entries of any non-orthogonal matrix.

This proves that O(n) is an algebraic set. Moreover, it can be proved that its dimension is

$$\frac{n(n - 1)}{2} = n^2 - \frac{n(n + 1)}{2},$$

which implies that O(n) is a complete intersection. This implies that all its irreducible components have the same dimension, and that it has no embedded component. In fact, O(n) has two irreducible components, that are distinguished by the sign of the determinant (that is det(A) = 1 or det(A) = −1). Both are nonsingular algebraic varieties of the same dimension n(n − 1) / 2. The component with det(A) = 1 is SO(n).

=== Maximal tori and Weyl groups ===
A maximal torus in a compact Lie group G is a maximal subgroup among those that are isomorphic to T^{k} for some k, where T = SO(2) is the standard one-dimensional torus.

In O(2n) and SO(2n), for every maximal torus, there is a basis on which the torus consists of the block-diagonal matrices of the form

$$\begin{bmatrix}
R_1 &        & 0    \\
& \ddots &      \\
0   &        & R_n
\end{bmatrix},$$

where each R_{j} belongs to SO(2). In O(2n + 1) and SO(2n + 1), the maximal tori have the same form, bordered by a row and a column of zeros, and 1 on the diagonal.

The Weyl group of SO(2n + 1) is the semidirect product $\{\pm 1\}^n \rtimes S_n$ of a normal elementary abelian 2-subgroup and a symmetric group, where the nontrivial element of each {±1} factor of {±1}^{n} acts on the corresponding circle factor of T × {1} by inversion, and the symmetric group S_{n} acts on both {±1}^{n} and T × {1} by permuting factors. The elements of the Weyl group are represented by matrices in O(2n) × {±1}. The S_{n} factor is represented by block permutation matrices with 2-by-2 blocks, and a final 1 on the diagonal. The {±1}^{n} component is represented by block-diagonal matrices with 2-by-2 blocks either

$$\begin{bmatrix}
1 & 0 \\
0 & 1
\end{bmatrix} \quad \text{or} \quad
\begin{bmatrix}
0 & 1 \\
1 & 0
\end{bmatrix},$$

with the last component ±1 chosen to make the determinant 1.

The Weyl group of SO(2n) is the subgroup $H_{n-1} \rtimes S_n < \{\pm 1\}^n \rtimes S_n$ of that of SO(2n + 1), where H_{n−1} < {±1}^{n} is the kernel of the product homomorphism {±1}^{n} → {±1} given by $\left(\varepsilon_1, \ldots, \varepsilon_n\right) \mapsto \varepsilon_1 \cdots \varepsilon_n$; that is, H_{n−1} < {±1}^{n} is the subgroup with an even number of minus signs. The Weyl group of SO(2n) is represented in SO(2n) by the preimages under the standard injection SO(2n) → SO(2n + 1) of the representatives for the Weyl group of SO(2n + 1). Those matrices with an odd number of
$$\begin{bmatrix}
0 & 1 \\
1 & 0
\end{bmatrix}$$
blocks have no remaining final −1 coordinate to make their determinants positive, and hence cannot be represented in SO(2n).

== Topology ==
=== Low-dimensional topology ===
The low-dimensional (real) orthogonal groups are familiar spaces:

- O(1) = S^{0}, a two-point discrete space, consisting of the identity map, and the reflection map on the line.
- SO(1) = {1}, since only the identity has determinant 1.
- SO(2) is S^{1}, as explained in the section "Symmetry group of spheres" above.
- SO(3) has the structure of real projective space, RP^{3}.
- SO(4) is doubly covered by Spin(4) = SU(2) × SU(2) = S^{3} × S^{3}, as explained below.

=== Fundamental group ===
In terms of algebraic topology, for n > 2 the fundamental group of SO(n) is cyclic of order 2, and the spin group Spin(n) is its universal cover. For n = 2 the fundamental group is infinite cyclic and the universal cover corresponds to the real line (the group Spin(2) is the unique connected 2-fold cover).

=== Homotopy groups ===
Generally, the homotopy groups π_{k}(O) of the real orthogonal group are related to homotopy groups of spheres, and thus are in general hard to compute. However, one can compute the homotopy groups of the stable orthogonal group (aka the infinite orthogonal group), defined as the direct limit of the sequence of inclusions:

$$\operatorname{O}(0) \subset \operatorname{O}(1)\subset \operatorname{O}(2) \subset \cdots \subset O = \bigcup_{k=0}^\infty \operatorname{O}(k)$$

Since the inclusions are all closed, hence cofibrations, this can also be interpreted as a union. On the other hand, S^{n} is a homogeneous space for O(n + 1), and one has the following fiber bundle:

$$\operatorname{O}(n) \to \operatorname{O}(n + 1) \to S^n,$$

which can be understood as "The orthogonal group O(n + 1) acts transitively on the unit sphere S^{n}, and the stabilizer of a point (thought of as a unit vector) is the orthogonal group of the perpendicular complement, which is an orthogonal group one dimension lower." Thus the natural inclusion O(n) → O(n + 1) is (n − 1)-connected, so the homotopy groups stabilize, and π_{k}(O(n + 1)) = π_{k}(O(n)) for n > k + 1: thus the homotopy groups of the stable space equal the lower homotopy groups of the unstable spaces.

From Bott periodicity we obtain Ω^{8}O ≃ O, therefore the homotopy groups of O are 8-fold periodic, meaning π_{k + 8}(O) = π_{k}(O), and so one need list only the first 8 homotopy groups:

$$\begin{align}
\pi_0 (O) &= \mathbf{Z} / 2\mathbf{Z}\\
\pi_1 (O) &= \mathbf{Z} / 2\mathbf{Z}\\
\pi_2 (O) &= 0\\
\pi_3 (O) &= \mathbf{Z}\\
\pi_4 (O) &= 0\\
\pi_5 (O) &= 0\\
\pi_6 (O) &= 0\\
\pi_7 (O) &= \mathbf{Z}
\end{align}$$

==== Relation to KO-theory ====
Via the clutching construction, homotopy groups of the stable space O are identified with stable vector bundles on spheres (up to isomorphism), with a dimension shift of 1: π_{k}(O) = π_{k + 1}(BO). Setting KO = BO × Z = Ω^{−1}O × Z (to make π_{0} fit into the periodicity), one obtains:

$$\begin{align}
\pi_0 (KO) &= \mathbf{Z}\\
\pi_1 (KO) &= \mathbf{Z} / 2\mathbf{Z}\\
\pi_2 (KO) &= \mathbf{Z} / 2\mathbf{Z}\\
\pi_3 (KO) &= 0\\
\pi_4 (KO) &= \mathbf{Z}\\
\pi_5 (KO) &= 0\\
\pi_6 (KO) &= 0\\
\pi_7 (KO) &= 0
\end{align}$$

==== Computation and interpretation of homotopy groups ====
===== Low-dimensional groups =====
The first few homotopy groups can be calculated by using the concrete descriptions of low-dimensional groups.

- π_{0}(O) = π_{0}(O(1)) = Z / 2Z, from orientation-preserving/reversing (this class survives to O(2) and hence stably)
- π_{1}(O) = π_{1}(SO(3)) = Z / 2Z, which is spin comes from SO(3) = RP^{3} = S^{3} / (Z / 2Z).
- π_{2}(O) = π_{2}(SO(3)) = 0, which surjects onto π_{2}(SO(4)); this latter thus vanishes.

===== Lie groups =====
From general facts about Lie groups, π_{2}(G) always vanishes, and π_{3}(G) is free (free abelian).

===== Vector bundles =====
π_{0}(KO) is a vector bundle over S^{0}, which consists of two points. Thus over each point, the bundle is trivial, and the non-triviality of the bundle is the difference between the dimensions of the vector spaces over the two points, so π_{0}(KO) = Z is the dimension.

===== Loop spaces =====
Using concrete descriptions of the loop spaces in Bott periodicity, one can interpret the higher homotopies of O in terms of simpler-to-analyze homotopies of lower order. Using π_{0}, O and O/U have two components, KO = BO × Z and KSp = BSp × Z have countably many components, and the rest are connected.

==== Interpretation of homotopy groups ====
In a nutshell:

- π_{0}(KO) = Z is about dimension
- π_{1}(KO) = Z / 2Z is about orientation
- π_{2}(KO) = Z / 2Z is about spin
- π_{4}(KO) = Z is about topological quantum field theory.

Let R be any of the four division algebras R, C, H, O, and let L_{R} be the tautological line bundle over the projective line RP^{1}, and [L_{R}] its class in K-theory. Noting that RP^{1} = S^{1}, CP^{1} = S^{2}, HP^{1} = S^{4}, OP^{1} = S^{8}, these yield vector bundles over the corresponding spheres, and

- π_{1}(KO) is generated by [L_{R}]
- π_{2}(KO) is generated by [L_{C}]
- π_{4}(KO) is generated by [L_{H}]
- π_{8}(KO) is generated by [L_{O}]

From the point of view of symplectic geometry, π_{0}(KO) ≅ π_{8}(KO) = Z can be interpreted as the Maslov index, thinking of it as the fundamental group π_{1}(U/O) of the stable Lagrangian Grassmannian as U/O ≅ Ω^{7}(KO), so π_{1}(U/O) = π_{1+7}(KO).

==== Whitehead tower ====
The orthogonal group anchors a Whitehead tower:

$$\cdots \rightarrow \operatorname{Fivebrane}(n) \rightarrow \operatorname{String}(n) \rightarrow \operatorname{Spin}(n) \rightarrow \operatorname{SO}(n) \rightarrow \operatorname{O}(n)$$

which is obtained by successively removing (killing) homotopy groups of increasing order. This is done by constructing short exact sequences starting with an Eilenberg–MacLane space for the homotopy group to be removed. The first few entries in the tower are the spin group and the string group, and are preceded by the fivebrane group. The homotopy groups that are killed are in turn π_{0}(O) to obtain SO from O, π_{1}(O) to obtain Spin from SO, π_{3}(O) to obtain String from Spin, and then π_{7}(O) and so on to obtain the higher order branes.

== Of indefinite quadratic form over the reals ==
Over the real numbers, nondegenerate quadratic forms are classified by Sylvester's law of inertia, which asserts that, on a vector space of dimension n, such a form can be written as the difference of a sum of p squares and a sum of q squares, with p + q = n. In other words, there is a basis on which the matrix of the quadratic form is a diagonal matrix, with p entries equal to 1, and q entries equal to −1. The pair (p, q) called the inertia, is an invariant of the quadratic form, in the sense that it does not depend on the way of computing the diagonal matrix.

The orthogonal group of a quadratic form depends only on the inertia, and is thus generally denoted O(p, q). Moreover, as a quadratic form and its opposite have the same orthogonal group, one has O(p, q) = O(q, p).

The standard orthogonal group is O(n) = O(n, 0) = O(0, n). So, in the remainder of this section, it is supposed that neither p nor q is zero.

The subgroup of the matrices of determinant 1 in O(p, q) is denoted SO(p, q). The group O(p, q) has four connected components, depending on whether an element preserves orientation on either of the two maximal subspaces where the quadratic form is positive definite or negative definite. The component of the identity, whose elements preserve orientation on both subspaces, is denoted SO^{+}(p, q).

The group O(3, 1) is the Lorentz group that is fundamental in relativity theory. Here the 3 corresponds to space coordinates, and 1 corresponds to the time coordinate.

== Of complex quadratic forms ==
Over the field C of complex numbers, every non-degenerate quadratic form in n variables is equivalent to x_{1}^{2} + ... + x_{n}^{2}. Thus, up to isomorphism, there is only one non-degenerate complex quadratic space of dimension n, and one associated orthogonal group, usually denoted O(n, C). It is the group of complex orthogonal matrices, complex matrices whose product with their transpose is the identity matrix.

As in the real case, O(n, C) has two connected components. The component of the identity consists of all matrices of determinant 1 in O(n, C); it is denoted SO(n, C).

The groups O(n, C) and SO(n, C) are complex Lie groups of dimension n(n − 1) / 2 over C (the dimension over R is twice that). For n ≥ 2, these groups are noncompact. As in the real case, SO(n, C) is not simply connected: For n > 2, the fundamental group of SO(n, C) is cyclic of order 2, whereas the fundamental group of SO(2, C) is Z.

== Over finite fields ==
=== Characteristic different from two ===
Over a field of characteristic different from two, two quadratic forms are equivalent if their matrices are congruent, that is if a change of basis transforms the matrix of the first form into the matrix of the second form. Two equivalent quadratic forms have clearly the same orthogonal group.

The non-degenerate quadratic forms over a finite field of characteristic different from two are completely classified into congruence classes, and it results from this classification that there is only one orthogonal group in odd dimension and two in even dimension.

More precisely, Witt's decomposition theorem asserts that (in characteristic different from two) every vector space equipped with a non-degenerate quadratic form Q can be decomposed as a direct sum of pairwise orthogonal subspaces

$$V = L_1 \oplus L_2 \oplus \cdots \oplus L_m \oplus W,$$

where each L_{i} is a hyperbolic plane (that is there is a basis such that the matrix of the restriction of Q to L_{i} has the form
$$\textstyle\begin{bmatrix}0&1\\1&0\end{bmatrix}$$
), and the restriction of Q to W is anisotropic (that is, Q(w) ≠ 0 for every nonzero w in W).

The Chevalley–Warning theorem asserts that, over a finite field, the dimension of W is at most two.

If the dimension of V is odd, the dimension of W is thus equal to one, and its matrix is congruent either to
$$\textstyle\begin{bmatrix}1\end{bmatrix}$$
or to
$$\textstyle\begin{bmatrix}\varphi\end{bmatrix},$$
where 𝜑 is a non-square scalar. It results that there is only one orthogonal group that is denoted O(2n + 1, q), where q is the number of elements of the finite field (a power of an odd prime).

If the dimension of W is two and −1 is not a square in the ground field (that is, if its number of elements q is congruent to 3 modulo 4), the matrix of the restriction of Q to W is congruent to either I or −I, where I is the 2×2 identity matrix. If the dimension of W is two and −1 is a square in the ground field (that is, if q is congruent to 1, modulo 4) the matrix of the restriction of Q to W is congruent to
$$\textstyle\begin{bmatrix}1&0\\0&\varphi\end{bmatrix},$$
φ is any non-square scalar.

This implies that if the dimension of V is even, there are only two orthogonal groups, depending whether the dimension of W zero or two. They are denoted respectively O^{+}(2n, q) and O^{−}(2n, q).

The orthogonal group O^{ε}(2, q) is a dihedral group of order 2(q − ε), where ε = ±.

Proof

For studying the orthogonal group of O^{ε}(2, q), one can suppose that the matrix of the quadratic form is
$$Q=\begin{bmatrix}1&0\\0&-\omega\end{bmatrix},$$
because, given a quadratic form, there is a basis where its matrix is diagonalizable. A matrix
$$A=\begin{bmatrix}a&b\\c&d\end{bmatrix}$$
belongs to the orthogonal group if AQA^{T} = Q, that is, a^{2} − ωb^{2} = 1, ac − ωbd = 0, and c^{2} − ωd^{2} = −ω. As a and b cannot be both zero (because of the first equation), the second equation implies the existence of ε in F_{q}, such that c = εωb and d = εa. Reporting these values in the third equation, and using the first equation, one gets that ε^{2} = 1, and thus the orthogonal group consists of the matrices

$$\begin{bmatrix}a&b\\\varepsilon\omega b&\varepsilon a\end{bmatrix},$$

where a^{2} − ωb^{2} = 1 and ε = ±1. Moreover, the determinant of the matrix is ε.

For further studying the orthogonal group, it is convenient to introduce a square root α of ω. This square root belongs to F_{q} if the orthogonal group is O^{+}(2, q), and to F_{q^{2}} otherwise. Setting x = a + αb, and y = a − αb, one has

$$xy=1,\qquad a=\frac{x+y}2\qquad b=\frac{x-y}{2\alpha}.$$

If
$$A_1=\begin{bmatrix}a_1&b_1\\\omega b_1&a_1\end{bmatrix}$$
and
$$A_2=\begin{bmatrix}a_2&b_2\\\omega b_2& a_2\end{bmatrix}$$
are two matrices of determinant one in the orthogonal group then

$$A_1A_2=\begin{bmatrix}a_1a_2+\omega b_1b_2 & a_1b_2+ b_1 a_2\\
\omega b_1a_2 +\omega a_1b_2 & \omega b_1b_2+ a_1a_1\end{bmatrix}.$$

This is an orthogonal matrix
$$\begin{bmatrix}a&b\\\omega b&a\end{bmatrix},$$
with a = a_{1}a_{2} + ωb_{1}b_{2}, and b = a_{1}b_{2} + b_{1}a_{2}. Thus

$$a+\alpha b = (a_1+\alpha b_1)(a_2+\alpha b_2).$$

It follows that the map (a, b) ↦ a + αb is a homomorphism of the group of orthogonal matrices of determinant one into the multiplicative group of F_{q^{2}}.

In the case of O^{+}(2n, q), the image is the multiplicative group of F_{q}, which is a cyclic group of order q.

In the case of O^{–}(2n, q), the above x and y are conjugate, and are therefore the image of each other by the Frobenius automorphism. This meant that $y=x^{-1}=x^q,$ and thus x^{q+1} = 1. For every such x one can reconstruct a corresponding orthogonal matrix. It follows that the map $(a,b)\mapsto a+\alpha b$ is a group isomorphism from the orthogonal matrices of determinant 1 to the group of the (q + 1)-roots of unity. This group is a cyclic group of order q + 1 which consists of the powers of g^{q−1}, where g is a primitive element of F_{q^{2}},

For finishing the proof, it suffices to verify that the group all orthogonal matrices is not abelian, and is the semidirect product of the group {1, −1} and the group of orthogonal matrices of determinant one.

The comparison of this proof with the real case may be illuminating.

Here two group isomorphisms are involved:

$$\begin{align}
\mathbf Z/(q+1)\mathbf Z &\to T\\
k&\mapsto g^{(q-1)k},
\end{align}$$

where g is a primitive element of F_{q^{2}} and T is the multiplicative group of the element of norm one in F_{q^{2}} ;

$$\begin{align}
\mathbf T &\to \operatorname{SO}^+ (2, \mathbf F_q) \\
x&\mapsto \begin{bmatrix}a&b\\\omega b&a\end{bmatrix},
\end{align}$$

with $a = \frac {x+x^{-1}}2$ and $b = \frac {x- x^{-1}}{2\alpha}.$

In the real case, the corresponding isomorphisms are:

$$\begin{align}
\mathbf R/2\pi\mathbf R &\to C\\
\theta&\mapsto e^{i\theta},
\end{align}$$

where C is the circle of the complex numbers of norm one;

$$\begin{align}
\mathbf C &\to \operatorname{SO}(2, \mathbf R) \\
x&\mapsto \begin{bmatrix}\cos\theta&\sin\theta\\-\sin\theta&\cos\theta\end{bmatrix},
\end{align}$$

with $\cos\theta = \frac {e^{i\theta}+e^{-i\theta}}2$ and $\sin\theta = \frac {e^{i\theta}-e^{-i\theta}}{2i}.$

When the characteristic is not two, the order of the orthogonal groups are

$$\left|\operatorname{O}(2n + 1, q)\right| = 2q^{n^2}\prod_{i=1}^{n}\left(q^{2i} - 1\right),$$
$$\left|\operatorname{O}^+(2n, q)\right| = 2q^{n(n-1)}\left(q^n-1\right)\prod_{i=1}^{n-1}\left(q^{2i} - 1\right),$$
$$\left|\operatorname{O}^-(2n, q)\right| = 2q^{n(n-1)}\left(q^n+ 1\right)\prod_{i=1}^{n-1}\left(q^{2i} - 1\right).$$

In characteristic two, the formulas are the same, except that the factor 2 of |O(2n + 1, q)| must be removed.

=== Dickson invariant ===
For orthogonal groups, the Dickson invariant is a homomorphism from the orthogonal group to the quotient group Z / 2Z (integers modulo 2), taking the value 0 in case the element is the product of an even number of reflections, and the value of 1 otherwise.

Algebraically, the Dickson invariant can be defined as D(f) = rank(I − f) modulo 2, where I is the identity (Taylor 1992, Theorem 11.43). Over fields that are not of characteristic 2 it is equivalent to the determinant: the determinant is −1 to the power of the Dickson invariant. Over fields of characteristic 2, the determinant is always 1, so the Dickson invariant gives more information than the determinant.

The special orthogonal group is the kernel of the Dickson invariant and usually has index 2 in O(n, F ). When the characteristic of F is not 2, the Dickson Invariant is 0 whenever the determinant is 1. Thus when the characteristic is not 2, SO(n, F ) is commonly defined to be the elements of O(n, F ) with determinant 1. Each element in O(n, F ) has determinant ±1. Thus in characteristic 2, the determinant is always 1.

The Dickson invariant can also be defined for Clifford groups and pin groups in a similar way (in all dimensions).

=== Orthogonal groups of characteristic 2 ===
Over fields of characteristic 2 orthogonal groups often exhibit special behaviors, some of which are listed in this section. (Formerly these groups were known as the hypoabelian groups, but this term is no longer used.)

- Any orthogonal group over any field is generated by reflections, except for a unique example where the vector space is 4-dimensional over the field with 2 elements and the Witt index is 2. A reflection in characteristic two has a slightly different definition. In characteristic two, the reflection orthogonal to a vector u takes a vector v to v + B(v, u)/Q(u) · u where B is the bilinear form and Q is the quadratic form associated to the orthogonal geometry. Compare this to the Householder reflection of odd characteristic or characteristic zero, which takes v to v − 2·B(v, u)/Q(u) · u.
- The center of the orthogonal group usually has order 1 in characteristic 2, rather than 2, since I = −I.
- In odd dimensions 2n + 1 in characteristic 2, orthogonal groups over perfect fields are the same as symplectic groups in dimension 2n. In fact the symmetric form is alternating in characteristic 2, and as the dimension is odd it must have a kernel of dimension 1, and the quotient by this kernel is a symplectic space of dimension 2n, acted upon by the orthogonal group.
- In even dimensions in characteristic 2 the orthogonal group is a subgroup of the symplectic group, because the symmetric bilinear form of the quadratic form is also an alternating form.

== The spinor norm ==
The spinor norm is a homomorphism from an orthogonal group over a field F to the quotient group F^{×} / (F^{×})^{2} of square classes (the multiplicative group of the field F up to multiplication by square elements), that takes reflection in a vector of norm n to the image of n in F^{×} / (F^{×})^{2}.

For the usual orthogonal group over the reals, it is trivial, but it is often non-trivial over other fields, or for the orthogonal group of a quadratic form over the reals that is not positive definite.

== Galois cohomology and orthogonal groups ==
In the theory of Galois cohomology of algebraic groups, some further points of view are introduced. They have explanatory value, in particular in relation with the theory of quadratic forms; but were for the most part post hoc, as far as the discovery of the phenomenon is concerned. The first point is that quadratic forms over a field can be identified as a Galois H^{1}, or twisted forms (torsors) of an orthogonal group. As an algebraic group, an orthogonal group is in general neither connected nor simply-connected; the latter point brings in the spin phenomena, while the former is related to the determinant.

The 'spin' name of the spinor norm can be explained by a connection to the spin group (more accurately a pin group). This may now be explained quickly by Galois cohomology (which however postdates the introduction of the term by more direct use of Clifford algebras). The spin covering of the orthogonal group provides a short exact sequence of algebraic groups.

$$1 \rightarrow \mu_2 \rightarrow \mathrm{Pin}_V \rightarrow \mathrm{O_V} \rightarrow 1$$

Here μ_{2} is the algebraic group of square roots of 1; over a field of characteristic not 2 it is roughly the same as a two-element group with trivial Galois action. The connecting homomorphism from H^{0}(O_{V}), which is simply the group O_{V}(F) of F-valued points, to H^{1}(μ_{2}) is essentially the spinor norm, because H^{1}(μ_{2}) is isomorphic to the multiplicative group of the field modulo squares.

There is also the connecting homomorphism from H^{1} of the orthogonal group, to the H^{2} of the kernel of the spin covering. The cohomology is non-abelian so that this is as far as we can go, at least with the conventional definitions.

== Lie algebra ==
The Lie algebra corresponding to Lie groups O(n, F ) and SO(n, F ) consists of the skew-symmetric n × n matrices, with the Lie bracket [ , ] given by the commutator. One Lie algebra corresponds to both groups. It is often denoted by $\mathfrak{o}(n, F)$ or $\mathfrak{so}(n, F)$, and called the orthogonal Lie algebra or special orthogonal Lie algebra. Over real numbers, these Lie algebras for different n are the compact real forms of two of the four families of semisimple Lie algebras: in odd dimension B_{k}, where n = 2k + 1, while in even dimension D_{r}, where n = 2r.

Since the group SO(n) is not simply connected, the representation theory of the orthogonal Lie algebras includes both representations corresponding to ordinary representations of the orthogonal groups, and representations corresponding to projective representations of the orthogonal groups. (The projective representations of SO(n) are just linear representations of the universal cover, the spin group Spin(n).) The latter are the so-called spin representation, which are important in physics.

More generally, given a vector space V (over a field with characteristic not equal to 2) with a nondegenerate symmetric bilinear form $\langle u,v \rangle$, the special orthogonal Lie algebra consists of tracefree endomorphisms $\varphi$ which are skew-symmetric for this form ($\langle\varphi A, B\rangle = -\langle A, \varphi B\rangle$). Over a field of characteristic 2 we consider instead the alternating endomorphisms. Concretely we can equate these with the bivectors of the exterior algebra, the antisymmetric tensors of $\wedge^2 V$. The correspondence is given by:

$$v\wedge w \mapsto \langle v,\cdot\rangle w - \langle w,\cdot\rangle v$$

This description applies equally for the indefinite special orthogonal Lie algebras $\mathfrak{so}(p, q)$ for symmetric bilinear forms with signature (p, q).

Over real numbers, this characterization is used in interpreting the curl of a vector field (naturally a bivector) as an infinitesimal rotation or "curl", hence the name.

== Related groups ==
The orthogonal groups and special orthogonal groups have a number of important subgroups, supergroups, quotient groups, and covering groups. These are listed below.

The inclusions O(n) ⊂ U(n) ⊂ USp(2n) and USp(n) ⊂ U(n) ⊂ O(2n) are part of a sequence of 8 inclusions used in a geometric proof of the Bott periodicity theorem, and the corresponding quotient spaces are symmetric spaces of independent interest – for example, U(n)/O(n) is the Lagrangian Grassmannian.

=== Lie subgroups ===
In physics, particularly in the areas of Kaluza–Klein compactification, it is important to find out the subgroups of the orthogonal group. The main ones are:

$\mathrm{O}(n) \supset \mathrm{O}(n - 1)$ – preserve an axis
$\mathrm{O}(2n) \supset \mathrm{U}(n) \supset \mathrm{SU}(n)$ – U(n) are those that preserve a compatible complex structure or a compatible symplectic structure – see 2-out-of-3 property; SU(n) also preserves a complex orientation.
$$\mathrm{O}(2n) \supset \mathrm{USp}(n)$$
$$\mathrm{O}(7) \supset \mathrm{G}_2$$

=== Lie supergroups ===
The orthogonal group O(n) is also an important subgroup of various Lie groups:

$$\begin{align}
\mathrm{U}(n)    &\supset \mathrm{O}(n) \\
\mathrm{USp}(2n) &\supset \mathrm{O}(n) \\
\mathrm{G}_2 &\supset \mathrm{O}(3) \\
\mathrm{F}_4 &\supset \mathrm{O}(9) \\
\mathrm{E}_6 &\supset \mathrm{O}(10) \\
\mathrm{E}_7 &\supset \mathrm{O}(12) \\
\mathrm{E}_8 &\supset \mathrm{O}(16)
\end{align}$$

==== Conformal orthogonal group ====
Being isometries, real orthogonal transforms preserve angles, and are thus conformal maps, though not all conformal linear transforms are orthogonal. In classical terms this is the difference between congruence and similarity, as exemplified by SSS (side-side-side) congruence of triangles and AAA (angle-angle-angle) similarity of triangles. The group of conformal linear maps of R^{n} is denoted CO(n) for the conformal orthogonal group, and consists of the product of the orthogonal group with the group of dilations. If n is odd, these two subgroups do not intersect, and they are a direct product: CO(2k + 1) = O(2k + 1) × R^{∗}, where R^{∗} = R∖{0} is the real multiplicative group, while if n is even, these subgroups intersect in ±1, so this is not a direct product, but it is a direct product with the subgroup of dilation by a positive scalar: CO(2k) = O(2k) × R^{+}.

Similarly one can define CSO(n); this is always: CSO(n) = CO(n) ∩ GL^{+}(n) = SO(n) × R^{+}.

=== Discrete subgroups ===
As the orthogonal group is compact, discrete subgroups are equivalent to finite subgroups. (Note: Infinite subsets of a compact space have an accumulation point and are not discrete.) These subgroups are known as point groups and can be realized as the symmetry groups of polytopes. A very important class of examples are the finite Coxeter groups, which include the symmetry groups of regular polytopes.

Dimension 3 is particularly studied – see point groups in three dimensions, polyhedral groups, and list of spherical symmetry groups. In 2 dimensions, the finite groups are either cyclic or dihedral – see point groups in two dimensions.

Other finite subgroups include:

- Permutation matrices (the Coxeter group A_{n})
- Signed permutation matrices (the Coxeter group B_{n}); also equals the intersection of the orthogonal group with the integer matrices. (Note: O(n) ∩ GL(n, Z) equals the signed permutation matrices because an integer vector of norm 1 must have a single non-zero entry, which must be ±1 (if it has two non-zero entries or a larger entry, the norm will be larger than 1), and in an orthogonal matrix these entries must be in different coordinates, which is exactly the signed permutation matrices.)

=== Covering and quotient groups ===
The orthogonal group is neither simply connected nor centerless, and thus has both a covering group and a quotient group, respectively:

- Two covering Pin groups, Pin_{+}(n) → O(n) and Pin_{−}(n) → O(n),
- The quotient projective orthogonal group, O(n) → PO(n).

These are all 2-to-1 covers.

For the special orthogonal group, the corresponding groups are:

- Spin group, Spin(n) → SO(n),
- Projective special orthogonal group, SO(n) → PSO(n).

Spin is a 2-to-1 cover, while in even dimension, PSO(2k) is a 2-to-1 cover, and in odd dimension PSO(2k + 1) is a 1-to-1 cover; i.e., isomorphic to SO(2k + 1). These groups, Spin(n), SO(n), and PSO(n) are Lie group forms of the compact special orthogonal Lie algebra, $\mathfrak{so}(n, \mathbf{R})$ – Spin is the simply connected form, while PSO is the centerless form, and SO is in general neither. (Note: In odd dimension, SO(2k + 1) ≅ PSO(2k + 1) is centerless (but not simply connected), while in even dimension SO(2k) is neither centerless nor simply connected.)

In dimension 3 and above these are the covers and quotients, while dimension 2 and below are somewhat degenerate; see specific articles for details.

== Principal homogeneous space: Stiefel manifold ==
The principal homogeneous space for the orthogonal group O(n) is the Stiefel manifold V_{n}(R^{n}) of orthonormal bases (orthonormal n-frames).

In other words, the space of orthonormal bases is like the orthogonal group, but without a choice of base point: given an orthogonal space, there is no natural choice of orthonormal basis, but once one is given one, there is a one-to-one correspondence between bases and the orthogonal group. Concretely, a linear map is determined by where it sends a basis: just as an invertible map can take any basis to any other basis, an orthogonal map can take any orthogonal basis to any other orthogonal basis.

The other Stiefel manifolds V_{k}(R^{n}) for k < n of incomplete orthonormal bases (orthonormal k-frames) are still homogeneous spaces for the orthogonal group, but not principal homogeneous spaces: any k-frame can be taken to any other k-frame by an orthogonal map, but this map is not uniquely determined.

== See also ==
=== Specific transforms ===
- Coordinate rotations and reflections
- Reflection through the origin

=== Specific groups ===
- rotation group, SO(3, R)
- SO(8)

=== Related groups ===
- indefinite orthogonal group
- unitary group
- symplectic group

=== Lists of groups ===
- list of finite simple groups
- list of simple Lie groups

=== Representation theory ===
- Representations of classical Lie groups
- Brauer algebra
