= Cartan–Dieudonné theorem =

Mathematic theorem

In mathematics, the Cartan–Dieudonné theorem, named after Élie Cartan and Jean Dieudonné, establishes that every orthogonal transformation in an n-dimensional symmetric bilinear space can be described as the composition of at most n reflections.

The notion of a symmetric bilinear space is a generalization of Euclidean space whose structure is defined by a symmetric bilinear form (which need not be positive definite, so is not necessarily an inner product – for instance, a pseudo-Euclidean space is also a symmetric bilinear space). The orthogonal transformations in the space are those automorphisms which preserve the value of the bilinear form between every pair of vectors; in Euclidean space, this corresponds to preserving distances and angles. These orthogonal transformations form a group under composition, called the orthogonal group.

For example, in the two-dimensional Euclidean plane, every orthogonal transformation is either a reflection across a line through the origin or a rotation about the origin (which can be written as the composition of two reflections). Any arbitrary composition of such rotations and reflections can be rewritten as a composition of no more than 2 reflections. Similarly, in three-dimensional Euclidean space, every orthogonal transformation can be described as a single reflection, a rotation (2 reflections), or an improper rotation (3 reflections). In four dimensions, double rotations are added that represent 4 reflections.

== Formal statement ==
Let (V, b) be an n-dimensional, non-degenerate symmetric bilinear space over a field with characteristic not equal to 2. Then, every element of the orthogonal group O(V, b) is a composition of at most n reflections.

== See also ==
- Indefinite orthogonal group
- Coordinate rotations and reflections
- Householder reflections
- Chasles' theorem
