= Quadratic pair =

Mathematical Quadratic formula

In mathematical finite group theory, a quadratic pair for the odd prime p, introduced by Thompson (1971), is a finite group G together with a quadratic module, a faithful representation M on a vector space over the finite field with p elements such that G is generated by elements with minimal polynomial (x − 1)^{2}. Thompson classified the quadratic pairs for p ≥ 5. Chermak (2004) classified the quadratic pairs for p = 3. With a few exceptions, especially for p = 3, groups with a quadratic pair for the prime p tend to be more or less groups of Lie type in characteristic p.

== See also ==
- p-stable group
