= Thompson uniqueness theorem =

On certain subgroups of a minimal simple finite group of odd order

In mathematical finite group theory, Thompson's original uniqueness theorem (Feit & Thompson 1963, theorems 24.5 and 25.2) states that in a minimal simple finite group of odd order there is a unique maximal subgroup containing a given elementary abelian subgroup of rank 3. Bender (1970) gave a shorter proof of the uniqueness theorem.
