= Chasles =

Chasles is a surname. Notable people with the surname include:

- Adelphe Chasles (1795–1868), French politician
- Jeanne Chasles (1869–1939), French dancer
- Michel Chasles (1793–1880), French mathematician
- Philarète Chasles (1798–1873), French critic and belletrist

== See also ==
- 18510 Chasles, minor planet
- Chasles' theorem, a number of mathematical theorems
- La Lande-Chasles, commune in the Maine-et-Loire department in western France
