= Dual number (disambiguation) =

Dual number may refer to:

- Dual numbers, a hypercomplex number system in mathematics, consisting of real numbers adjoined with a nil-squaring element.
- The dual number, a grammatical number used by some languages to indicate two items.
- Dual SIM or "dual number SIM", a method for providing a mobile telephone with two telephone numbers
