= Crystallographic axis =

Crystallographic axis may refer to a:

- rotational symmetry axis in a crystal
- crystallographic screw axis
- direct or reciprocal axis of a crystal's unit cell
