= Chasles' theorem =

Chasles' theorem may refer to any of several mathematical results attributed to Michel Chasles (1793–1880):

- Chasles' theorem (kinematics), about translation of rigid bodies
- Chasles' theorem (gravity), about gravitational attraction of a spherical shell
- Chasles' theorem (geometry), in algebraic geometry about intersections of curves
- Triangle inequality, sometimes called Chasles' relation
