= Eduard Study =

German mathematician (1862 – 1930)

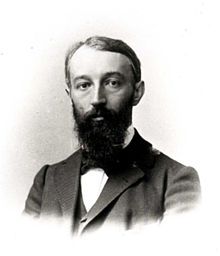
- Born: 23 March 1862; Coburg
- Died: 6 January 1930 (aged 67); Bonn
- Education: Ludwig-Maximilians-Universität München
- Known for: Geometrie der Dynamen; Invariant theory Spherical trigonometry
- Scientific career
- Fields: Mathematics
- Doctoral advisor: Philipp Ludwig Seidel; Gustav Conrad Bauer
- Doctoral students: Julian Coolidge; Ernst August Weiß

Christian Hugo Eduard Study (/ˈʃtuːdi/ SHTOO-dee; 23 March 1862, Coburg – 6 January 1930, Bonn) was a German mathematician known for work on invariant theory of ternary forms (1889) and for the study of spherical trigonometry. He is also known for contributions to space geometry, hypercomplex numbers, and criticism of early physical chemistry.

Study was born in Coburg in the Duchy of Saxe-Coburg-Gotha.

== Career ==
Eduard Study began his studies at the University of Jena, the University of Strasbourg, Leipzig University, and the Ludwig-Maximilians-Universität München. He loved to study biology, especially entomology. He was awarded the doctorate in mathematics at the Ludwig-Maximilians-Universität München in 1884. Paul Gordan, an expert in invariant theory was at Leipzig, and Study returned there as Privatdozent. In 1888, he moved to Marburg University and in 1893 embarked on a speaking tour in the U.S.A. He appeared at a Congress of Mathematicians in Chicago as part of the World's Columbian Exposition and took part in mathematics at Johns Hopkins University. Back in Germany, in 1894, he was appointed extraordinary professor at the University of Göttingen. Then, he gained the rank of full professor in 1897 at the University of Greifswald. In 1904, he was called to the University of Bonn as the position held by Rudolf Lipschitz was vacant. There he settled until retirement in 1927.

Study gave a plenary address at the International Congress of Mathematicians in 1904 at Heidelberg and another in 1912 at Cambridge, UK.

== Euclidean space group and dual quaternions ==
In 1891 Eduard Study published "Of Motions and Translations, in two parts". It treats the Euclidean group E(3). The second part of his article introduces the associative algebra of dual quaternions, that is numbers

$$q = a + bi + cj + dk \!$$

where a, b, c, and d are dual numbers and {1, i, j, k} multiply as in the quaternion group. Actually Study uses notation such that

$$e_0 = 1,\  e_1 = i,\  e_2 = j,\  e_3 = k, \!$$

$$\varepsilon _0 = \varepsilon ,\  \varepsilon _1 = \varepsilon i,\  \varepsilon _2 = \varepsilon j,\  \varepsilon _3 = \varepsilon k. \!$$

The multiplication table is found on page 520 of volume 39 (1891) in Mathematische Annalen under the title "Von Bewegungen und Umlegungen, I. und II. Abhandlungen". Eduard Study cites William Kingdon Clifford as an earlier source on these biquaternions. In 1901 Study published Geometrie der Dynamen also using dual quaternions. In 1913, he wrote a review article treating both E(3) and elliptic geometry. This article, "Foundations and goals of analytical kinematics" develops the field of kinematics, in particular exhibiting an element of E(3) as a homography of dual quaternions.

Study's use of abstract algebra was noted in A History of Algebra (1985) by B. L. van der Waerden. On the other hand, Joe Rooney recounts these developments in relation to kinematics.

== Hypercomplex numbers ==
Study showed an early interest in systems of complex numbers and their application to transformation groups with his article in 1890. He addressed this popular subject again in 1898 in Klein's encyclopedia. The essay explored quaternions and other hypercomplex number systems. This 34-page article was expanded to 138 pages in 1908 by Élie Cartan, who surveyed the hypercomplex systems in Encyclopédie des sciences mathématiques pures et appliqueés. Cartan acknowledged Eduard Study's guidance, in his title, with the words "after Eduard Study".

In the 1993 biography of Cartan by Akivis and Rosenfeld, one reads:

[Study] defined the algebra °H of 'semiquaternions' with the units 1, i, ε, η having the properties $i^2 = -1, \ \varepsilon ^2 = 0, \ i \varepsilon = - \varepsilon i = \eta. \!$
Semiquaternions are often called 'Study's quaternions'.

In 1985 Helmut Karzel and Günter Kist developed "Study's quaternions" as the kinematic algebra corresponding to the group of motions of the Euclidean plane. These quaternions arise in "Kinematic algebras and their geometries" alongside ordinary quaternions and the ring of 2×2 real matrices which Karzel and Kist cast as the kinematic algebras of the elliptic plane and hyperbolic plane respectively. See the "Motivation and Historical Review" at page 437 of Rings and Geometry, R. Kaya editor.

Some of the other hypercomplex systems in that study are dual numbers, dual quaternions, and split-biquaternions, all being associative algebras over R.

== Ruled surfaces ==
Study's work with dual numbers and line coordinates was noted by Heinrich Guggenheimer in 1963 in his book Differential Geometry (see pages 162–5). He cites and proves the following theorem of Study: The oriented lines in R^{3} are in one-to-one correspondence with the points of the dual unit sphere in D^{3}. Later he says "A differentiable curve A(u) on the dual unit sphere, depending on a real parameter u, represents a differentiable family of straight lines in R^{3}: a ruled surface. The lines A(u) are the generators or rulings of the surface." Guggenheimer also shows the representation of the Euclidean motions in R^{3} by orthogonal dual matrices.

== Hermitian form metric ==
In 1905 Study wrote "Kürzeste Wege im komplexen Gebiet" (Shortest paths in the complex domain) for Mathematische Annalen (60:321–378). Some of its contents were anticipated by Guido Fubini a year before. The distance Study refers to is a Hermitian form on complex projective space. Since then this metric has been called the Fubini–Study metric. Study was careful in 1905 to distinguish the hyperbolic and elliptic cases in Hermitian geometry.

== Valence theory ==
Somewhat surprisingly Eduard Study is known by practitioners of quantum chemistry. Like James Joseph Sylvester, Paul Gordan believed that invariant theory could contribute to the understanding of chemical valence. In 1900 Gordan and his student G. Alexejeff contributed an article on an analogy between the coupling problem for angular momenta and their work on invariant theory to the Zeitschrift für Physikalische Chemie (v. 35, p. 610). In 2006 Wormer and Paldus summarized Study's role as follows:

The analogy, lacking a physical basis at the time, was criticised heavily by the mathematician E. Study and ignored completely by the chemistry community of the 1890s. After the advent of quantum mechanics it became clear, however, that chemical valences arise from electron–spin couplings ... and that electron spin functions are, in fact, binary forms of the type studied by Gordan and Clebsch.

== Cited publications ==
- Über die Geometrie der Kegelschnitte insbesondere deren Charakteristikenproblem. Teubner, Leipzig 1885.
- Methoden zur Theorie der ternaeren Formen. Teubner, Leipzig 1889.
- Sphärische Trigonometrie, orthogonale Substitutionen, und elliptische Functionen: Eine analytisch-geometrische Untersuchung. S. Hirzel, Leipzig 1893.
- Aeltere und neuere Untersuchungen über Systeme complexer Zahlen, Mathematical Papers Chicago Congress.
- Die Hauptsätze der Quaternionentheorie. Gaertner, Berlin 1900.
- Geometrie der Dynamen. Die Zusammensetzung von Kräften und verwandte Gegenstände der Geometrie. Teubner, Leipzig 1903.
- Vorlesungen über ausgewählte Gegenstände der Geometrie. Teubner, Leipzig 1911
- Konforme Abbildung einfach-zusammenhängender Bereiche. Teubner, Leipzig 1913.
- Die realistische Weltansicht und die Lehre vom Raume. Friedr. Vieweg und Sohn, Braunschweig 1914.
- Einleitung in die Theorie der Invarianten linearer Transformationen auf Grund der Vektorenrechnung. Friedr. Vieweg und Sohn, Braunschweig 1923.
- Mathematik und Physik - Eine erkenntnistheoretische Untersuchung. Friedr. Vieweg und Sohn, Braunschweig 1923.
- Theorie der allgemeinen und höheren komplexen Grossen in Encyklopädie der mathematischen Wissenschaften, weblink to University of Göttingen.
