= Screw axis =

Geometric axis of rotation and translation

A helix on a screw axis

A screw axis (helical axis or twist axis) is a line that is simultaneously the axis of rotation and the line along which translation of a body occurs. Chasles' theorem shows that each Euclidean displacement in three-dimensional space has a screw axis, and the displacement can be decomposed into a rotation about and a slide along this screw axis.

Plücker coordinates are used to locate a screw axis in space, and consist of a pair of three-dimensional vectors. The first vector identifies the direction of the axis, and the second locates its position. The special case when the first vector is zero is interpreted as a pure translation in the direction of the second vector. A screw axis is associated with each pair of vectors in the algebra of screws, also known as screw theory.

The spatial movement of a body can be represented by a continuous set of displacements. Because each of these displacements has a screw axis, the movement has an associated ruled surface known as a screw surface. This surface is not the same as the axode, which is traced by the instantaneous screw axes of the movement of a body. The instantaneous screw axis, or instantaneous helical axis (IHA), is the axis of the helicoidal field generated by the velocities of every point in a moving body.

When a spatial displacement specializes to a planar displacement, the screw axis becomes the displacement pole, and the instantaneous screw axis becomes the velocity pole, or instantaneous center of rotation, also called an instant center. The term centro is also used for a velocity pole, and the locus of these points for a planar movement is called a centrode.

== History ==
The proof that a spatial displacement can be decomposed into a rotation around, and translation along, a line in space is attributed to Michel Chasles in 1830. Recently the work of Giulio Mozzi has been identified as presenting a similar result in 1763.

== Screw axis symmetry ==
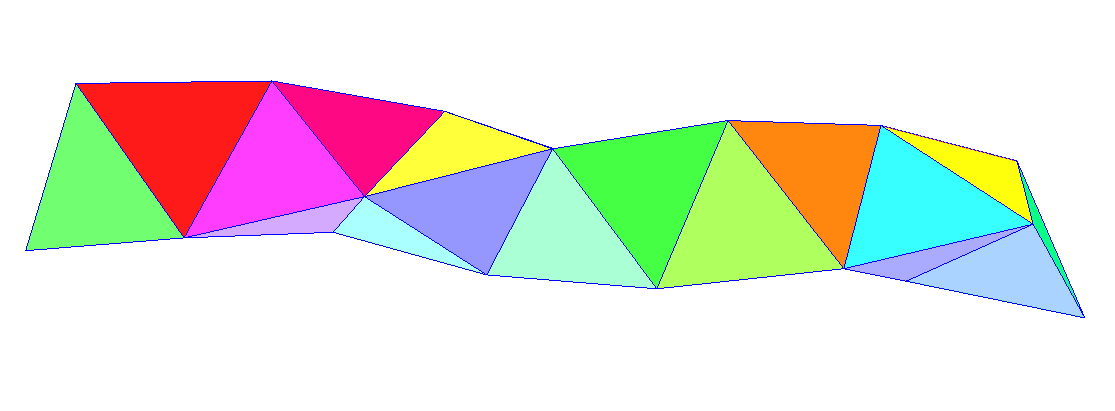
The Boerdijk–Coxeter helix is an example of a screw axis symmetry that is nonperiodic.

A screw displacement (also screw operation or rotary translation) is the composition of a rotation by an angle φ about an axis (called the screw axis) with a translation by a distance d along this axis. A positive rotation direction usually means one that corresponds to the translation direction by the right-hand rule. This means that if the rotation is clockwise, the displacement is away from the viewer. Except for φ = 180°, we have to distinguish a screw displacement from its mirror image. Unlike for rotations, a righthand and lefthand screw operation generate different groups.

The combination of a rotation about an axis and a translation in a direction perpendicular to that axis is a rotation about a parallel axis. However, a screw operation with a nonzero translation vector along the axis cannot be reduced like that. Thus the effect of a rotation combined with any translation is a screw operation in the general sense, with as special cases a pure translation, a pure rotation and the identity. Together these are all the direct isometries in 3D.

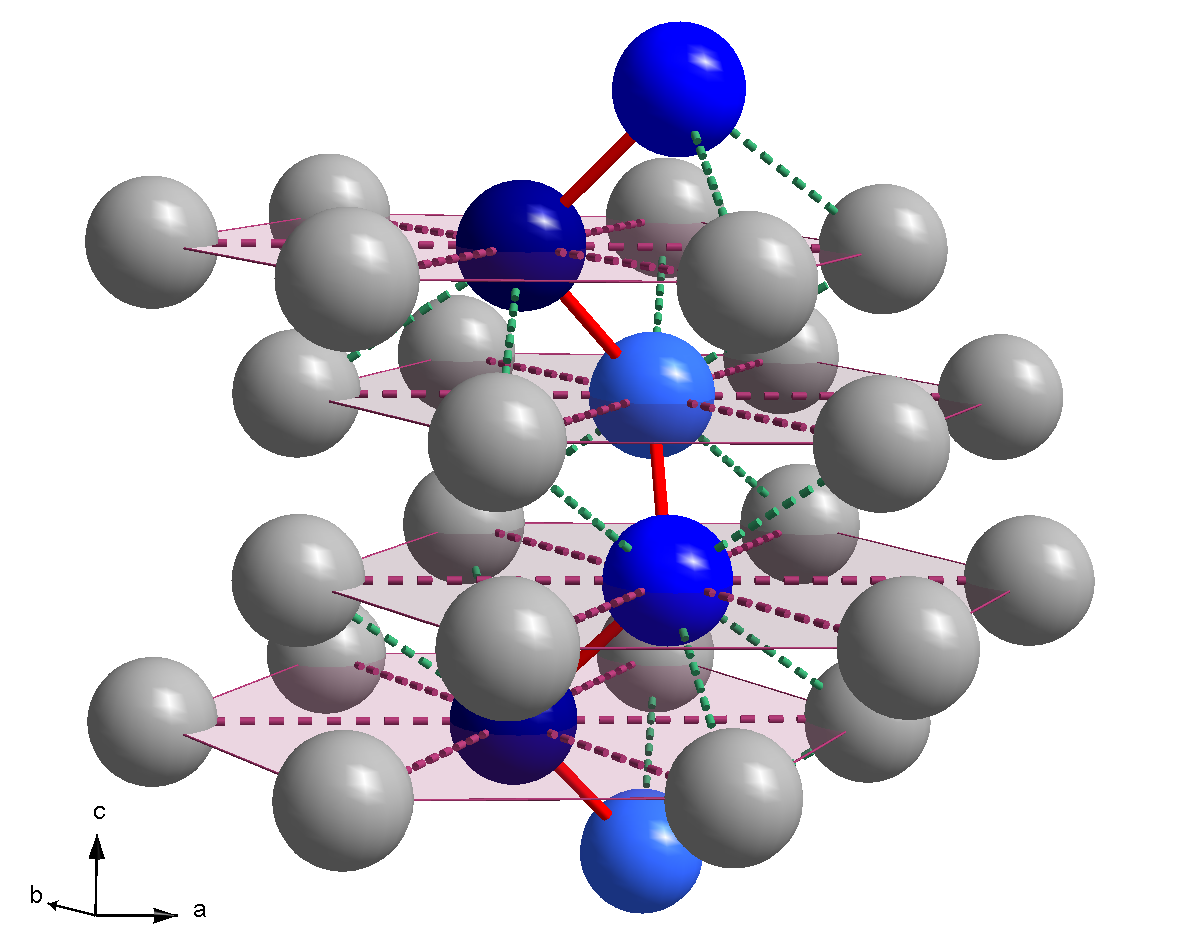
3_{1} screw axis in crystal structure of tellurium

In crystallography, a screw axis symmetry is a combination of rotation about an axis and a translation parallel to that axis which leaves a crystal unchanged. If φ = 360°/n for some positive integer n, then screw axis symmetry implies translational symmetry with a translation vector which is n times that of the screw displacement.

Applicable for space groups is a rotation by 360°/n about an axis, combined with a translation along the axis by a multiple of the distance of the translational symmetry, divided by n. This multiple is indicated by a subscript. So, 6_{3} is a rotation of 60° combined with a translation of one half of the lattice vector, implying that there is also 3-fold rotational symmetry about this axis. The possibilities are 2_{1}, 3_{1}, 4_{1}, 4_{2}, 6_{1}, 6_{2}, and 6_{3}, and the enantiomorphous 3_{2}, 4_{3}, 6_{4}, and 6_{5}.

Considering a screw axis n_{m}, if g is the greatest common divisor of n and m, then there is also a g-fold rotation axis. When n/g screw operations have been performed, the displacement will be m/g, which since it is a whole number means one has moved to an equivalent point in the lattice, while carrying out a rotation by 360°/g. So 4_{2}, 6_{2} and 6_{4} create two-fold rotation axes, while 6_{3} creates a three-fold axis.

A non-discrete screw axis isometry group contains all combinations of a rotation about some axis and a proportional translation along the axis (in rifling, the constant of proportionality is called the twist rate); in general this is combined with k-fold rotational isometries about the same axis (k ≥ 1); the set of images of a point under the isometries is a k-fold helix; in addition there may be a 2-fold rotation about a perpendicularly intersecting axis, and hence a k-fold helix of such axes.

== Screw axis of a spatial displacement ==
=== Geometric argument ===
Let D : R^{3} → R^{3} be an orientation-preserving rigid motion of R^{3}. The set of these transformations is a subgroup of Euclidean motions known as the special Euclidean group SE(3). These rigid motions are defined by transformations of x in R^{3} given by

$$D(\mathbf{x})=A(\mathbf{x}) + \mathbf{d}$$

consisting of a three-dimensional rotation A followed by a translation by the vector d.

A three-dimensional rotation A has a unique axis that defines a line L. Let the unit vector along this line be S so that the translation vector d can be resolved into a sum of two vectors, one parallel and one perpendicular to the axis L, that is,

$$\mathbf{d}=\mathbf{d}_L + \mathbf{d}_{\perp},\quad \mathbf{d}_L =(\mathbf{d}\cdot\mathbf{S})\mathbf{S}, \quad \mathbf{d}_{\perp}=\mathbf{d}- \mathbf{d}_L.$$

In this case, the rigid motion takes the form

$$D(\mathbf{x})=(A(\mathbf{x}) + \mathbf{d}_{\perp}) + \mathbf{d}_L.$$

Now, the orientation preserving rigid motion D* = A(x) + d_{⊥} transforms all the points of R^{3} so that they remain in planes perpendicular to L. For a rigid motion of this type there is a unique point c in the plane P perpendicular to L through 0, such that

$$D^*(\mathbf{C})=A(\mathbf{C})+\mathbf{d}_{\perp}=\mathbf{C}.$$

The point C can be calculated as

$$\mathbf{C}=[I-A]^{-1}\mathbf{d}_{\perp},$$

because d_{⊥} does not have a component in the direction of the axis of A.

A rigid motion D* with a fixed point must be a rotation of around the axis L_{c} through the point c. Therefore, the rigid motion

$$D(\mathbf{x})=D^*(\mathbf{x}) + \mathbf{d}_L,$$

consists of a rotation about the line L_{c} followed by a translation by the vector d_{L} in the direction of the line L_{c}.

Conclusion: every rigid motion of R^{3} is the result of a rotation of R^{3} about a line L_{c} followed by a translation in the direction of the line. The combination of a rotation about a line and translation along the line is called a screw motion.

=== Computing a point on the screw axis ===
A point C on the screw axis satisfies the equation:

$$D^*(\mathbf{C})=A(\mathbf{C})+\mathbf{d}_{\perp}=\mathbf{C}.$$

Solve this equation for C using Cayley's formula for a rotation matrix

$$[A]=[I-B]^{-1}[I+B],$$

where [B] is the skew-symmetric matrix constructed from Rodrigues' vector

$$\mathbf{b}=\tan\frac{\phi}{2}\mathbf{S},$$

such that

$$[B]\mathbf{y}=\mathbf{b}\times\mathbf{y}.$$

Use this form of the rotation A to obtain

$$\mathbf{C} =[I-B]^{-1}[I+B]\mathbf{C} + \mathbf{d}_{\perp},\quad [I-B]\mathbf{C} =[I+B]\mathbf{C} + [I-B]\mathbf{d}_{\perp},$$

which becomes

$$-2[B]\mathbf{C} =[I-B]\mathbf{d}_{\perp}.$$

This equation can be solved for C on the screw axis P(t) to obtain,

$$\mathbf{C} = \frac{\mathbf{b}\times\mathbf{d} - \mathbf{b}\times(\mathbf{b}\times\mathbf{d})}{2\mathbf{b}\cdot\mathbf{b}}.$$

The screw axis P(t) = C + tS of this spatial displacement has the Plücker coordinates S = (S, C × S).

== Dual quaternion ==
The screw axis appears in the dual quaternion formulation of a spatial displacement D = ([A], d). The dual quaternion is constructed from the dual vector S = (S, V) defining the screw axis and the dual angle (φ, d), where φ is the rotation about and d the slide along this axis, which defines the displacement D to obtain,

$$\hat{S} = \cos\frac{\hat{\varphi}}{2} + \sin\frac{\hat{\varphi}}{2} \mathsf{S}.$$

A spatial displacement of points q represented as a vector quaternion can be defined using quaternions as the mapping

$$\mathbf{q} \mapsto S\mathbf{q}S^{-1} + \mathbf{d}$$

where d is translation vector quaternion and S is a unit quaternion, also called a versor, given by

$$S=\cos \theta + \mathbf{S} \sin \theta , \ \ \mathbf{S}^2 = -1 ,$$

that defines a rotation by 2θ around an axis S.

In the proper Euclidean group E^{+}(3) a rotation may be conjugated with a translation to move it to a parallel rotation axis. Such a conjugation, using quaternion homographies, produces the appropriate screw axis to express the given spatial displacement as a screw displacement, in accord with Chasles’ theorem.

== Mechanics ==
The instantaneous motion of a rigid body may be the combination of rotation about an axis (the screw axis) and a translation along that axis. This screw move is characterized by the velocity vector for the translation and the angular velocity vector in the same or opposite direction. If these two vectors are constant and along one of the principal axes of the body, no external forces are needed for this motion (moving and spinning). As an example, if gravity and drag are ignored, this is the motion of a bullet fired from a rifled gun.

=== Biomechanics ===
This parameter is often used in biomechanics, when describing the motion of joints of the body. For any period of time, joint motion can be seen as the movement of a single point on one articulating surface with respect to the adjacent surface (usually distal with respect to proximal). The total translation and rotations along the path of motion can be defined as the time integrals of the instantaneous translation and rotation velocities at the IHA for a given reference time.

In any single plane, the path formed by the locations of the moving instantaneous axis of rotation (IAR) is known as the 'centroid', and is used in the description of joint motion.

== See also ==
- Corkscrew (roller coaster element)
- Euler's rotation theorem – rotations without translation
- Glide reflection
- Helical symmetry
- Line group
- Screw theory
- Space group
