= Invariant decomposition =

Concept in group theory (mathematics)

The invariant decomposition is a decomposition of the elements of pin groups $\text{Pin}(p,q,r)$ into orthogonal commuting elements. It is also valid in their subgroups, e.g. orthogonal, pseudo-Euclidean, conformal, and classical groups. Because the elements of Pin groups are the composition of $k$ oriented reflections, the invariant decomposition theorem reads

Every $k$-reflection can be decomposed into $\lceil k/2 \rceil$ commuting factors.

It is named the invariant decomposition because these factors are the invariants of the $k$-reflection $R \in \text{Pin}(p,q,r)$. A well known special case is the Chasles' theorem, which states that any rigid body motion in $\text{SE}(3)$ can be decomposed into a rotation around, followed or preceded by a translation along, a single line. Both the rotation and the translation leave two lines invariant: the axis of rotation and the orthogonal axis of translation. Since both rotations and translations are bireflections, a more abstract statement of the theorem reads "Every quadreflection can be decomposed into commuting bireflections". In this form the statement is also valid for e.g. the spacetime algebra $\text{SO}(3,1)$, where any Lorentz transformation can be decomposed into a commuting rotation and boost.

== Bivector decomposition ==
Any bivector $F$ in the geometric algebra $\mathbb{R}_{p,q,r}$ of total dimension $n = p+q+r$ can be decomposed into $k = \lfloor n / 2 \rfloor$ orthogonal commuting simple bivectors that satisfy

$$F = F_1 + F_2 \ldots + F_{k}.$$

Defining $\lambda_i := F_i^2 \in \mathbb{C}$, their properties can be summarized as $F_i F_j = \delta_{ij} \lambda_i + F_i \wedge F_j$ (no sum). The $F_i$ are then found as solutions to the characteristic polynomial

$$0 = (F_1 - F_i) (F_2 - F_i) \cdots (F_k - F_i).$$

Defining

$$W_{m} = \frac{1}{m!}\langle F^{m}\rangle_{2 m} = \frac{1}{m!}\, \underbrace{F \wedge F \wedge \ldots \wedge F}_{m\ \text{times}}$$
and $r = \lfloor k/2 \rfloor$, the solutions are given by

$$F_i
= \begin{cases}
\dfrac{\lambda_i^{r} W_0 + \lambda_i^{r-1} W_2 + \ldots + W_k}{\lambda_i^{r-1} W_1 + \lambda_i^{r-2} W_3 + \ldots + W_{k-1}} \quad & k \text{ even}, \\[10mu]
\dfrac{\lambda_i^{r} W_1 + \lambda_i^{r-1} W_3 + \ldots + W_k}{\lambda_i^{r}  W_0  + \lambda_i^{r-1} W_2 + \ldots + W_{k-1}} & k \text{ odd}.
\end{cases}$$

The values of $\lambda_i$ are subsequently found by squaring this expression and rearranging, which yields the polynomial

$$\begin{aligned}
0 &= \sum_{m=0}^{k} \langle W_{m}^2 \rangle_0 (- \lambda_i)^{k-m} \\[5mu]
&= (F_1^2 - \lambda_i) (F_2^2 - \lambda_i) \cdots (F_k^2 - \lambda_i).
\end{aligned}$$

By allowing complex values for $\lambda_i$, the counter example of Marcel Riesz can in fact be solved. This closed form solution for the invariant decomposition is only valid for eigenvalues $\lambda_i$ with algebraic multiplicity of 1. For degenerate $\lambda_i$ the invariant decomposition still exists, but cannot be found using the closed form solution.

== Exponential map ==
A $2k$-reflection $R \in \text{Spin}(p,q,r)$ can be written as $R = \exp(F)$ where $F \in \mathfrak{spin}(p,q,r)$ is a bivector, and thus permits a factorization

$$R = e^F = e^{F_1} e^{F_2} \cdots e^{F_k}.$$

The invariant decomposition therefore gives a closed form formula for exponentials, since each $F_i$ squares to a scalar and thus follows Euler's formula:

$$R_i = e^{F_i} =
{\cosh}\bigl(\sqrt{\lambda_i}\bigr)
+ \frac{{\sinh}\bigl(\sqrt{\lambda_i}\bigr)}{\sqrt{\lambda_i}} F_i.$$

Carefully evaluating the limit $\lambda_i \to 0$ gives

$$R_i = e^{F_i} = 1 + F_i,$$

and thus translations are also included.

== Rotor factorization ==
Given a $2k$-reflection $R \in \text{Spin}(p,q,r)$ we would like to find the factorization into $R_i = \exp(F_i)$. Defining the simple bivector

$$t(F_i) := \frac{{\tanh}\bigl(\sqrt{\lambda_i}\bigr)}{\sqrt{\lambda_i}} F_i,$$

where $\lambda_i = F_i^2$. These bivectors can be found directly using the above solution for bivectors by substituting

$$W_m = \langle R \rangle_{2m} \big/ \langle R \rangle_0$$

where $\langle R \rangle_{2m}$ selects the grade $2m$ part of $R$. After the bivectors $t(F_i)$ have been found, $R_i$ is found straightforwardly as

$$R_i = \frac{1 + t(F_i)}{\sqrt{1 - t(F_i)^2}}.$$

== Principal logarithm ==
After the decomposition of $R \in \text{Spin}(p,q,r)$ into $R_i = \exp(F_i)$ has been found, the principal logarithm of each simple rotor is given by

$$F_i = \text{Log}(R_i) = \begin{cases}
\dfrac{\langle R_i \rangle_2 }{\textstyle \sqrt{\langle R_i \rangle\vphantom)_2^2}} \;\text{arccosh}(\langle R_i \rangle) \quad & \lambda_i^2 \neq 0, \\[5mu]
\langle R_i \rangle_2 & \lambda_i^2 = 0.
\end{cases}$$

and thus the logarithm of $R$ is given by

$$\text{Log}(R) = \sum_{i=1}^k \text{Log}(R_i).$$

== General Pin group elements ==
So far we have only considered elements of $\text{Spin}(p,q,r)$, which are $2k$-reflections. To extend the invariant decomposition to a $(2k+1)$-reflections $P \in \text{Pin}(p,q,r)$, we use that the vector part $r = \langle P \rangle_1$ is a reflection which already commutes with, and is orthogonal to, the $2k$-reflection $R = r^{-1} P = P r^{-1}$. The problem then reduces to finding the decomposition of $R$ using the method described above.

== Invariant bivectors ==
The bivectors $F_i$ are invariants of the corresponding $R \in \text{Spin}(p,q,r)$ since they commute with it, and thus under group conjugation

$$R F_i R^{-1} = F_i.$$

Going back to the example of Chasles' theorem as given in the introduction, the screw motion in 3D leaves invariant the two lines $F_1$ and $F_2$, which correspond to the axis of rotation and the orthogonal axis of translation on the horizon. While the entire space undergoes a screw motion, these two axes remain unchanged by it.

== History ==
The invariant decomposition finds its roots in a statement made by Marcel Riesz about bivectors:

Can any bivector $F$ be decomposed into the direct sum of mutually orthogonal simple bivectors?

Mathematically, this would mean that for a given bivector $F$ in an $n$ dimensional geometric algebra, it should be possible to find a maximum of $k = \lfloor n/2 \rfloor$ bivectors $F_i$, such that $F = \sum_{i=1}^{\lfloor n/2 \rfloor} F_i$, where the $F_i$ satisfy $F_i \cdot F_j = [F_i, F_j] = 0$ and should square to a scalar $\lambda_i := F_i^2 \in \mathbb{R}$. Marcel Riesz gave some examples which lead to this conjecture, but also one (seeming) counter example. A first more general solution to the conjecture in geometric algebras $\mathbb{R}_{n,0,0}$ was given by David Hestenes and Garret Sobczyck. However, this solution was limited to purely Euclidean spaces. In 2011 the solution in $\mathbb{R}_{4,1,0}$ (3DCGA) was published by Leo Dorst and Robert Jan Valkenburg, and was the first solution in a Lorentzian signature. Also in 2011, Charles Gunn was the first to give a solution in the degenerate metric $\mathbb{R}_{3,0,1}$. This offered a first glimpse that the principle might be metric independent. Then, in 2021, the full metric and dimension independent closed form solution was given by Martin Roelfs in his PhD thesis. And because bivectors in a geometric algebra $\mathbb{R}_{p,q,r}$ form the Lie algebra $\mathfrak{spin}(p,q,r)$, the thesis was also the first to use this to decompose elements of $\text{Spin}(p,q,r)$ groups into orthogonal commuting factors which each follow Euler's formula, and to present closed form exponential and logarithmic functions for these groups. Subsequently, in a paper by Martin Roelfs and Steven De Keninck the invariant decomposition was extended to include elements of $\text{Pin}(p,q,r)$, not just $\text{Spin}(p,q,r)$, and the direct decomposition of elements of $\text{Spin}(p,q,r)$ without having to pass through $\mathfrak{spin}(p,q,r)$ was found.
