= Motion (geometry) =

Transformation of a geometric space preserving structure

A glide reflection is a type of Euclidean motion.

In geometry, a motion is an isometry of a metric space. For instance, a plane equipped with the Euclidean distance metric is a metric space in which a mapping associating congruent figures is a motion.

Motions can be divided into direct (also known as proper or rigid) and indirect (or improper) motions. Direct motions include translations and rotations, which preserve the orientation of a chiral shape. Indirect motions include reflections, glide reflections, and Improper rotations, that invert the orientation of a chiral shape. Some geometers define motion in such a way that only direct motions are motions.

More generally, the term motion is a synonym for surjective isometry in metric geometry, including elliptic geometry and hyperbolic geometry. In the latter case, hyperbolic motions provide an approach to the subject for beginners.

== In differential geometry ==
In differential geometry, a diffeomorphism is called a motion if it induces an isometry between the tangent space at a manifold point and the tangent space at the image of that point.

== Group of motions ==
Given a geometry, the set of motions forms a group under composition of mappings. This group of motions is noted for its properties. For example, the Euclidean group is noted for the normal subgroup of translations. In the plane, a direct Euclidean motion is either a translation or a rotation, while in space every direct Euclidean motion may be expressed as a screw displacement according to Chasles' theorem. When the underlying space is a Riemannian manifold, the group of motions is a Lie group. Furthermore, the manifold has constant curvature if and only if, for every pair of points and every isometry, there is a motion taking one point to the other for which the motion induces the isometry.

The idea of a group of motions for special relativity has been advanced as Lorentzian motions. For example, fundamental ideas were laid out for a plane characterized by the quadratic form $\ x^2 - y^2 \$ in American Mathematical Monthly. The motions of Minkowski space were described by Sergei Novikov in 2006:

The physical principle of constant velocity of light is expressed by the requirement that the change from one inertial frame to another is determined by a motion of Minkowski space, i.e. by a transformation

$$\phi : R^{1,3} \mapsto  R^{1,3}$$

preserving space-time intervals. This means that

$$\langle \phi(x) - \phi(y),\  \phi(x) - \phi(y) \rangle \ =\ \langle x - y,\ x - y \rangle$$

for each pair of points x and y in R^{1,3}.

== History ==
An early appreciation of the role of motion in geometry was given by Alhazen (965 to 1039). His work "Space and its Nature" uses comparisons of the dimensions of a mobile body to quantify the vacuum of imaginary space. He was criticised by Omar Khayyam who noted that Aristotle had condemned the use of motion in geometry.

In the 19th century Felix Klein became a proponent of group theory as a means to classify geometries according to their "groups of motions". He proposed using symmetry groups in his Erlangen program, a suggestion that was widely adopted. He noted that every Euclidean congruence is an affine mapping, and each of these is a projective transformation; therefore the group of projectivities contains the group of affine maps, which in turn contains the group of Euclidean congruences. The term motion, shorter than transformation, puts more emphasis on the adjectives: projective, affine, Euclidean. The context was thus expanded, so much that "In topology, the allowed movements are continuous invertible deformations that might be called elastic motions."

The science of kinematics is dedicated to rendering physical motion into expression as mathematical transformation. Frequently the transformation can be written using vector algebra and linear mapping. A simple example is a turn written as a complex number multiplication: $z \mapsto \omega z \$ where $\ \omega = \cos \theta + i \sin \theta, \quad i^2 = -1$. Rotation in space is achieved by use of quaternions, and Lorentz transformations of spacetime by use of biquaternions. Early in the 20th century, hypercomplex number systems were examined. Later their automorphism groups led to exceptional groups such as G2.

In the 1890s logicians were reducing the primitive notions of synthetic geometry to an absolute minimum. Giuseppe Peano and Mario Pieri used the expression motion for the congruence of point pairs. Alessandro Padoa celebrated the reduction of primitive notions to merely point and motion in his report to the 1900 International Congress of Philosophy. It was at this congress that Bertrand Russell was exposed to continental logic through Peano. In his book Principles of Mathematics (1903), Russell considered a motion to be a Euclidean isometry that preserves orientation.

In 1914 D. M. Y. Sommerville used the idea of a geometric motion to establish the idea of distance in hyperbolic geometry when he wrote Elements of Non-Euclidean Geometry. He explains:

By a motion or displacement in the general sense is not meant a change of position of a single point or any bounded figure, but a displacement of the whole space, or, if we are dealing with only two dimensions, of the whole plane. A motion is a transformation which changes each point P into another point P ′ in such a way that distances and angles are unchanged.

== Axioms of motion ==
László Rédei gives as axioms of motion:

1. Any motion is a one-to-one mapping of space R onto itself such that every three points on a line will be transformed into (three) points on a line.
2. The identical mapping of space R is a motion.
3. The product of two motions is a motion.
4. The inverse mapping of a motion is a motion.
5. If we have two planes A, A' two lines g, g' and two points P, P' such that P is on g, g is on A, P' is on g' and g' is on A' then there exist a motion mapping A to A', g to g' and P to P'
6. There is a plane A, a line g, and a point P such that P is on g and g is on A then there exist four motions mapping A, g and P onto themselves, respectively, and not more than two of these motions may have every point of g as a fixed point, while there is one of them (i.e. the identity) for which every point of A is fixed.
7. There exists three points A, B, P on line g such that P is between A and B and for every point C (unequal P) between A and B there is a point D between C and P for which no motion with P as fixed point can be found that will map C onto a point lying between D and P.

Axioms 2 to 4 imply that motions form a group.

Axiom 5 means that the group of motions provides group actions on R that are transitive so that there is a motion that maps every line to every line

== Notes and references ==
- Tristan Needham (1997) Visual Complex Analysis, Euclidean motion p 34, direct motion p 36, opposite motion p 36, spherical motion p 279, hyperbolic motion p 306, Clarendon Press, ISBN 0-19-853447-7 .
- Miles Reid & Balázs Szendröi (2005) Geometry and Topology, Cambridge University Press, ISBN 0-521-61325-6, MR 2194744.
