= Aleksandr Kotelnikov =

Russian mathematician (1865 to 1944)

- Born: Aleksandr Petrovich Kotelnikov; October 20, 1865; Kazan, Russian Empire
- Died: March 6, 1944 (aged 78); Moscow, Soviet Union
- Education: Kazan University
- Awards: Stalin Prize (1943)
- Scientific career
- Thesis: The Cross-Product Calculus and Certain of its Applications in Geometry and Mechanics (1884)
- Academic advisors: Ippolit S. Gromeka

Aleksandr Petrovich Kotelnikov (Russian: Алекса́ндр Петро́вич Коте́льников; October 20, 1865 – March 6, 1944) was a Russian and Soviet mathematician specializing in geometry and kinematics.

== Biography ==
Aleksandr was the son of P.I. Kotelnikov, a colleague of Nikolai Lobachevsky. The subject of hyperbolic geometry was non-Euclidean geometry, a departure from tradition. The early exposure to Lobachevsky's work eventually led to Aleksandr undertaking the job of editing Lobachevsky's works.

Kotelnikov studied at Kazan University, graduating in 1884. He began teaching at a gymnasium. Having an interest in mechanics, he did graduate study. His thesis was The Cross-Product Calculus and Certain of its Applications in Geometry and Mechanics. His work contributed to the development of screw theory and kinematics. Kotelnikov began instructing at the university in 1893. His habilitation thesis was The Projective Theory of Vectors (1899).

In Kiev, Kotelnikov was professor and head of the department of pure mathematics until 1904. Returning to Kazan, he headed the mathematics department until 1914. He was at the Kyiv Polytechnic Institute directing the department of Theoretical Mechanics until 1924, when he moved to Moscow and took up teaching at Bauman Technical University.

In addition to the Works of Lobachevsky, Kotelnikov was also the editor of the collected works of Nikolay Zhukovsky, the father of Russian aerodynamics.

One reviewer put Kotelnikov at the head of a chain of investigations of Spaces over Algebras. Successive researchers included D.N. Zeiliger, A.P. Norden, and B. A. Rosenfel'd.

== Dual quaternions ==
Kotelnikov advanced an algebraic method of representing Euclidean motions that had been introduced by William Kingdon Clifford. Though developed to render motions in three-dimensional space, an eight-dimensional algebra of doubled quaternions $\mathbb{H}$ was used. Clifford had shown that a space of rotations entailed elliptic space described by versors in his four-dimensional quaternions. According to Wilhelm Blaschke, it was Kotelnikov who initiated a "conversion principle" to take a dual rotation acting on elliptic space to a motion of $\mathbb{R}^3$, three-dimensional Euclidean space:

If r is one of the square roots of minus one in $\mathbb{H}$, then an underline ($\underline{r}$) represents the elliptic line in the plane perpendicular to r (Blaschke: the united elliptic line). Using the inner product on $\mathbb{H}$ formed by taking the product of a quaternion with its conjugate, the condition

$<\underline{r},\ \underline{s}>\ = \ 0$ is equivalent to
$<r,\ s>\ =\ 0 \ \ \text{and}\ <r, s^*> + <r^*, s> \ =\ 0,$ and implies that elliptic lines $\underline{r} \ \text{and}\ \underline{s}$ are perpendicular. Under these conditions, the Kotelnikov conversion to Euclidean motion is represented as
$q \ = \ Q^* p Q \ \ \text{where}\ \ Q \ = \ \cos (\underline{\omega} ) + \underline{u}\ \sin(\underline{\omega})$ and where $\underline{u}$ is the screw axis.

== Other works ==
- 1925: Introduction to Theoretical Mechanics, Moscow-Leningrad
- 1927: The Principle of Relativity and Lobachevsky's Geometry, Kazan
- 1950: The Theory of Vectors and Complex Numbers, Moscow-Leningrad

== Literature ==
- A.T. Grigorian (1976) "Aleksandr Petrovich Kotelnikov", Dictionary of Scientific Biography.
- B.L. Laptev & B.A. Rozenfel'd (1996) Mathematics of the 19th Century: Geometry, page 87, Birkhäuser Verlag ISBN 3-7643-5048-2 .
- O'Connor, John J.; Robertson, Edmund F., "Aleksandr Petrovich Kotelnikov", MacTutor History of Mathematics Archive, University of St Andrews
