= Adelphe Chasles =

French politician

Henri Lubin Adelphe Chasles (5 October 1795 – 28 January 1868) was a 19th-century French politician.

== Biography ==
The brother of mathematician Michel Chasles, he was a notary in Paris during the Bourbon restoration.

Mayor of Chartres from 27 August 1830 to 10 December 1847, president of the departmental council and MP for Eure-et-Loir from 1831 to 1848, he was part of the majority in the National Assembly supporting the ministries of the July Monarchy.

He was appointed mayor by King Louis-Philippe in 1830, although Chasles had anonymously written anticlerical articles in a local newspaper.

He was also president of the comice agricole of Chartres.

As mayor of Chartres he was responsible for the creation of the district of Petits-Blés, the demolishing of fortifications and bridging the gap that stretched from place Saint-Michel to that of the Épars. The creation of Boulevard Chasles (formerly Boulevard Saint-Michel) and rue Mathurin Régnier. The destruction of the walls between the gate of Chatelet and that of Saint-Jean, the creation of the Savings Bank of the city, the slaughterhouses of Saint-Brice, a shelter hall and the lighting by gas of the city. He was also responsible for helping with the reconstruction of the Chartes Cathedral, after the disastrous fire of 4 June 1836, despite his past anticlerical actions.

Chasles was made chevalier of the Légion d'honneur in 1844.

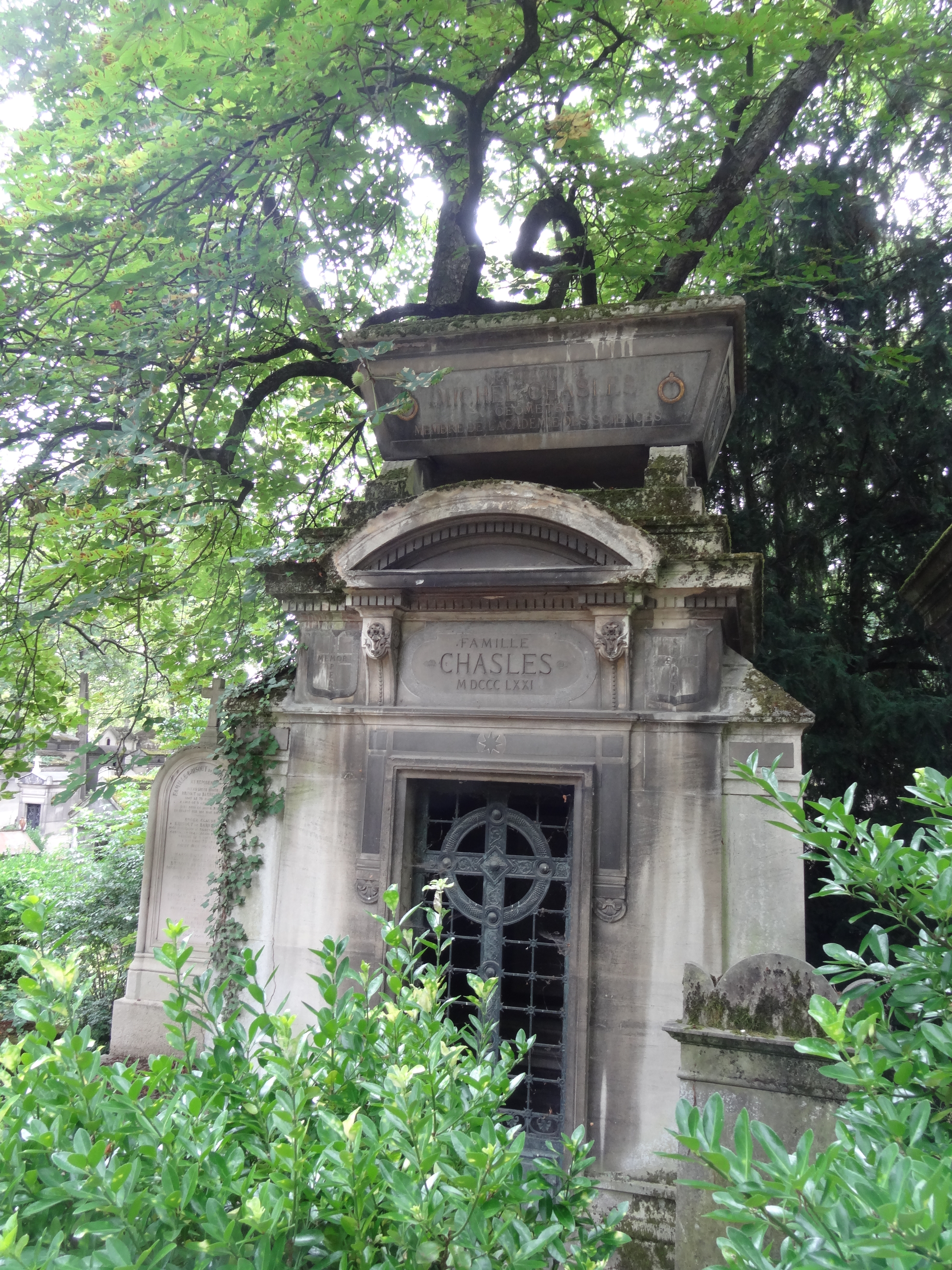
Mausoleum of Chasles at Père Lachaise Cemetery.

He died in Paris on 28 January 1868, and is interred at the Père Lachaise Cemetery.

== Sources ==
- Dictionnaire des parlementaires français de 1789 à 1889 (Adolphe Robert, Edgar Bourloton et Gaston Cougny). gallica BNF.
