= Von Staudt conic =

In projective geometry, a von Staudt conic is the point set defined by all the absolute points of a polarity that has absolute points. In the real projective plane a von Staudt conic is a conic section in the usual sense. In more general projective planes this is not always the case. Karl Georg Christian von Staudt introduced this definition in Geometrie der Lage (1847) as part of his attempt to remove all metrical concepts from projective geometry.

== Polarities ==
A polarity, π, of a projective plane, P, is an involutory (i.e., of order two) bijection between the points and the lines of P that preserves the incidence relation. Thus, a polarity relates a point Q with a line q and, following Gergonne, q is called the polar of Q and Q the pole of q. An absolute point (line) of a polarity is one which is incident with its polar (pole).

A polarity may or may not have absolute points. A polarity with absolute points is called a hyperbolic polarity and one without absolute points is called an elliptic polarity. In the complex projective plane all polarities are hyperbolic but in the real projective plane only some are.

A classification of polarities over arbitrary fields follows from the classification of sesquilinear forms given by Birkhoff and von Neumann. Orthogonal polarities, corresponding to symmetric bilinear forms, are also called ordinary polarities and the locus of absolute points forms a non-degenerate conic (set of points whose coordinates satisfy an irreducible homogeneous quadratic equation) if the field does not have characteristic two. In characteristic two the orthogonal polarities are called pseudopolarities and in a plane the absolute points form a line.

== Finite projective planes ==
If π is a polarity of a finite projective plane (which need not be desarguesian), P, of order n then the number of its absolute points (or absolute lines), a(π) is given by:

a(π) = n + 2r√n + 1,

where r is a non-negative integer. Since a(π) is an integer, a(π) = n + 1 if n is not a square, and in this case, π is called an orthogonal polarity.

R. Baer has shown that if n is odd, the absolute points of an orthogonal polarity form an oval (that is, n + 1 points, no three collinear), while if n is even, the absolute points lie on a non-absolute line.

In summary, von Staudt conics are not ovals in finite projective planes (desarguesian or not) of even order.

== Relation to other types of conics ==
In a pappian plane (i.e., a projective plane coordinatized by a field), if the field does not have characteristic two, a von Staudt conic is equivalent to a Steiner conic. However, R. Artzy has shown that these two definitions of conics can produce non-isomorphic objects in (infinite) Moufang planes.
