= Michel Chasles =

French mathematician (1793–1880)

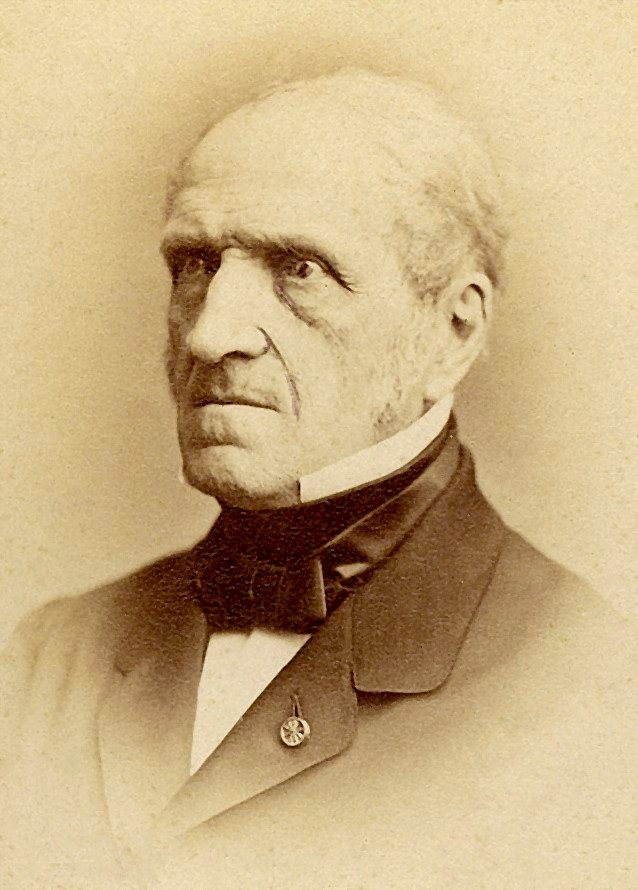
- Michel Chasles
- Born: 15 November 1793; Épernon, France
- Died: 18 December 1880 (aged 87); Paris
- Education: École Polytechnique
- Known for: Chasles's theorems
- Awards: Copley Medal (1865)
- Scientific career
- Fields: Mathematics
- Doctoral advisor: Siméon Denis Poisson
- Doctoral students: Jean Gaston Darboux; Hubert Anson Newton

Michel Floréal Chasles (French pronunciation: [miʃɛl flɔʁeal ʃal]; 15 November 1793 – 18 December 1880) was a French mathematician.

== Early life ==
He was born at Épernon in France and studied at the École Polytechnique in Paris under Siméon Denis Poisson. In the War of the Sixth Coalition he was drafted to fight in the defence of Paris in 1814. After the war, he gave up on a career as an engineer or stockbroker in order to pursue his mathematical studies.

== Career ==
In 1837 he published the book Aperçu historique sur l'origine et le développement des méthodes en géométrie ("Historical view of the origin and development of methods in geometry"), a study of the method of reciprocal polars in projective geometry. The work gained him considerable fame and respect; he was appointed Professor at the École Polytechnique in 1841 and was awarded a chair at the Sorbonne in 1846. A second edition of this book was published in 1875. In 1839, Ludwig Adolph Sohncke (the father of Leonhard Sohncke) translated the original into German as Geschichte der geometrie, hauptsachlich mit bezug auf die neueren methoden. Shortly thereafter, in 1841, Charles Graves published an English version as Two Geometrical Memoirs on the General Properties of Cones of the Second Degree and on the Spherical Conics, adding a significant amount of original material.

Jakob Steiner had proposed Steiner's conic problem of enumerating the number of conic sections tangent to each of five given conics and had answered it incorrectly. Chasles developed a theory of characteristics that enabled the correct enumeration of the conics (there are 3264) (see enumerative geometry). He established several important theorems (all called Chasles's theorem). In kinematics, Chasles's description of a Euclidean motion in space as screw displacement was seminal to the development of the theories of dynamics of rigid bodies. Chasles was elected a Foreign Honorary Member of the American Academy of Arts and Sciences in 1864. In 1865 he was awarded the Copley Medal.

As described in A Treasury of Deception, by Michael Farquhar (Penguin Books, 2005), between 1861 and 1869 Chasles purchased some of the 27,000 forged letters from Frenchman Denis Vrain-Lucas. Included in this trove were letters from Alexander the Great to Aristotle, from Cleopatra to Julius Caesar, and from Mary Magdalene to a revived Lazarus, all in a fake medieval French. In 2004, the journal Critical Inquiry published a recently "discovered" 1871 letter written by Vrain-Lucas (from prison) to Chasles, conveying Vrain-Lucas's perspective on these events, itself an invention.

== Legacy ==
In 1986, Alexander Jones published a commentary on Book 7 of the Collection of Pappus of Alexandria, which Chasles had referred to in his history of geometric methods. Jones makes these comments about Chasles, Pappus and Euclid:

Chasles's contribution to our comprehension of the Porisms tends to be obscured by the inherent unreasonableness of his claim to have restored substantially the contents of Euclid's book on the basis of the meagre data of Pappus and Proclus...one still turns to Chasles for the first appreciation of the interest in the Porisms from the point of view of modern geometry. Above all, he was the first to notice the recurrence of cross-ratios and harmonic ratios in the lemmas, and because these concepts suffuse most of his restoration, it is probable that many of his inventions coincide with some of Euclid's, even if we cannot now tell which they are.

Chasles's name is one of the 72 names inscribed on the Eiffel Tower in Paris.

== Bibliography ==
- Chasles, M. (1831). "Note sur les propriétés générales du système de deux corps semblables entr'eux". Bulletin des Sciences Mathématiques, Astronomiques, Physiques et Chemiques (in French). 14: 321–326.
- M. Chasles (1837) Aperçu historique sur l'origine et le développement des méthodes en géométrie, originally published by Hayez in Bruxelles, now from archive.org.
- M. Chasles (1841) Two geometrical memoirs on the general properties of cones of the second degree, and other spherical conics, Charles Graves translator, originally published in Dublin, now from Cornell University.
- M. Chasles (1852, 1880) Traité de Géométrie Supérieure, Gauthier-Villars.
- M. Chasles (1865) Traité des sections coniques, Gauthier-Villars, from University of Michigan.

== See also ==
- Chasles–Cayley–Brill formula
- Chasles's theorem (disambiguation)
- Asteroid 18510 Chasles
