= Pseudovector =

Physical quantity that changes sign with improper rotation

A loop of wire (black), carrying a current I, creates a magnetic field B (blue). If the position and current of the wire are reflected across the plane indicated by the dashed line, the magnetic field it generates would not be reflected: Instead, it would be reflected and reversed. The position and current at any point in the wire are "true" vectors, but the magnetic field B is a pseudovector.

In physics and mathematics, a pseudovector (or axial vector) is a quantity that transforms like a vector under continuous rigid transformations such as rotations or translations, but which does not transform like a vector under certain discontinuous rigid transformations such as reflections. For example, the angular velocity of a rotating object is a pseudovector because, when the object is reflected in a mirror, the reflected image rotates in such a way that its angular velocity is not the mirror image of the angular velocity of the original object. For true vectors (also known as polar vectors), the reflection vector and the original vector must be mirror images.

One example of a pseudovector is the normal to an oriented plane, called an oriented plane. Other examples of pseudovectors in three dimensions are the curl of a polar vector field at a point and the cross product of two polar vectors.

A number of vector physical quantities behave as pseudovectors rather than polar vectors, including magnetic field and torque. In mathematics, in three dimensions, pseudovectors are equivalent to bivectors, from which the transformation rules of pseudovectors can be derived. More generally, in n-dimensional exterior algebra and geometric algebra, pseudovectors are the elements of the algebra with dimension n − 1, written ⋀^{n−1}R^{n}. The label "pseudo-" can be further generalized to pseudoscalars and pseudotensors, both of which gain an extra sign-flip under improper rotations compared to a true scalar or tensor.

== Physical examples ==
Physical examples of pseudovectors include angular velocity, angular acceleration, angular momentum, torque, magnetic field, and magnetic dipole moment.

Each wheel of the car on the left driving away from an observer has an angular momentum pseudovector pointing left. The same is true for the mirror image of the car. The fact that the arrows point in the same direction, rather than being mirror images of each other, indicates that they are pseudovectors.

Consider the pseudovector angular momentum L = Σ(r × p). Driving in a car, and looking forward, each of the wheels has an angular momentum vector pointing to the left (by the right-hand rule). If the world is reflected in a mirror which switches the left and right side of the car, the "reflection" of this angular momentum "vector" (viewed as an ordinary vector) points to the right, but the actual angular momentum vector of the wheel (which is still turning forward in the reflection) still points to the left (by the right-hand rule), corresponding to the extra sign flip in the reflection of a pseudovector.

The distinction between polar vectors and pseudovectors becomes important in understanding the effect of symmetry on the solution to physical systems. Consider an electric current loop in the z = 0 plane that inside the loop generates a magnetic field oriented in the z direction. This system is symmetric (invariant) under mirror reflections through this plane, with the magnetic field unchanged by the reflection. But reflecting the magnetic field as a vector through that plane would be expected to reverse it; this expectation is corrected by realizing that the magnetic field is a pseudovector, with the extra sign flip leaving it unchanged.

In physics, pseudovectors are generally the result of taking the cross product of two polar vectors or the curl of a polar vector field. The cross product and curl are defined, by convention, according to the right hand rule, but could have been just as easily defined in terms of a left-hand rule. The entire body of physics that deals with (right-handed) pseudovectors and the right hand rule could be replaced by using (left-handed) pseudovectors and the left hand rule without issue. The (left) pseudovectors so defined would be opposite in direction to those defined by the right-hand rule.

While vector relationships in physics can be expressed in a coordinate-free manner, a coordinate system is required in order to express vectors and pseudovectors as numerical quantities. Vectors are represented as ordered triplets of numbers: e.g. $\mathbf{a}=(a_x,a_y,a_z)$, and pseudovectors are represented in this form too. When transforming between left and right-handed coordinate systems, representations of pseudovectors do not transform as vectors, and treating them as vector representations will cause an incorrect sign change, so that care must be taken to keep track of which ordered triplets represent vectors, and which represent pseudovectors. This problem does not exist if the cross product of two vectors is replaced by the exterior product of the two vectors, which yields a bivector which is a 2nd rank tensor and is represented by a 3×3 matrix. This representation of the 2-tensor transforms correctly between any two coordinate systems, independently of their handedness.

== Details ==
The definition of a "vector" in physics (including both polar vectors and pseudovectors) is more specific than the mathematical definition of "vector" (namely, any element of an abstract vector space). Under the physics definition, a "vector" is required to have components that "transform" in a certain way under a proper rotation: In particular, if everything in the universe were rotated, the vector would rotate in exactly the same way. (The coordinate system is fixed in this discussion; in other words this is the perspective of active transformations.) Mathematically, if everything in the universe undergoes a rotation described by a rotation matrix R, so that a displacement vector x is transformed to x′ = Rx, then any "vector" v must be similarly transformed to v′ = Rv. This important requirement is what distinguishes a vector (which might be composed of, for example, the x-, y-, and z-components of velocity) from any other triplet of physical quantities (For example, the length, width, and height of a rectangular box cannot be considered the three components of a vector, since rotating the box does not appropriately transform these three components.)

(In the language of differential geometry, this requirement is equivalent to defining a vector to be a tensor of contravariant rank one. In this more general framework, higher rank tensors can also have arbitrarily many and mixed covariant and contravariant ranks at the same time, denoted by raised and lowered indices within the Einstein summation convention.)

A basic and rather concrete example is that of row and column vectors under the usual matrix multiplication operator: in one order they yield the dot product, which is just a scalar and as such a rank zero tensor, while in the other they yield the dyadic product, which is a matrix representing a rank two mixed tensor, with one contravariant and one covariant index. As such, the noncommutativity of standard matrix algebra can be used to keep track of the distinction between covariant and contravariant vectors. This is in fact how the bookkeeping was done before the more formal and generalised tensor notation came to be. It still manifests itself in how the basis vectors of general tensor spaces are exhibited for practical manipulation.

The discussion so far only relates to proper rotations, i.e. rotations about an axis. However, one can also consider improper rotations, i.e. a mirror-reflection possibly followed by a proper rotation. (One example of an improper rotation is inversion through a point in 3-dimensional space.) Suppose everything in the universe undergoes an improper rotation described by the improper rotation matrix R, so that a position vector x is transformed to x′ = Rx. If the vector v is a polar vector, it will be transformed to v′ = Rv. If it is a pseudovector, it will be transformed to v′ = −Rv.

The transformation rules for polar vectors and pseudovectors can be compactly stated as

$$\begin{align}
\mathbf{v}' & = R\mathbf{v} & & \text{(polar vector)} \\
\mathbf{v}' & = (\det R)(R\mathbf{v}) & & \text{(pseudovector)}
\end{align}$$

where the symbols are as described above, and the rotation matrix R can be either proper or improper. The symbol det denotes determinant; this formula works because the determinant of proper and improper rotation matrices are +1 and −1, respectively.

=== Behavior under addition, subtraction, scalar multiplication ===
Suppose v_{1} and v_{2} are known pseudovectors, and v_{3} is defined to be their sum, v_{3} = v_{1} + v_{2}. If the universe is transformed by a rotation matrix R, then v_{3} is transformed to

$$\begin{align}
\mathbf{v_3}' = \mathbf{v_1}'+\mathbf{v_2}' & = (\det R)(R\mathbf{v_1}) + (\det R)(R\mathbf{v_2}) \\
& = (\det R)(R(\mathbf{v_1}+\mathbf{v_2}))=(\det R)(R\mathbf{v_3}).
\end{align}$$

So v_{3} is also a pseudovector. Similarly one can show that the difference between two pseudovectors is a pseudovector, that the sum or difference of two polar vectors is a polar vector, that multiplying a polar vector by any real number yields another polar vector, and that multiplying a pseudovector by any real number yields another pseudovector.

On the other hand, suppose v_{1} is known to be a polar vector, v_{2} is known to be a pseudovector, and v_{3} is defined to be their sum, v_{3} = v_{1} + v_{2}. If the universe is transformed by an improper rotation matrix R, then v_{3} is transformed to

$$\mathbf{v_3}' = \mathbf{v_1}'+\mathbf{v_2}' = (R\mathbf{v_1}) + (\det R)(R\mathbf{v_2}) = R(\mathbf{v_1}+(\det R) \mathbf{v_2}).$$

Therefore, v_{3} is neither a polar vector nor a pseudovector (although it is still a vector, by the physics definition). For an improper rotation, v_{3} does not in general even keep the same magnitude:

$$|\mathbf{v_3}| = |\mathbf{v_1}+\mathbf{v_2}|, \text{ but } \left|\mathbf{v_3}'\right| = \left|\mathbf{v_1}'-\mathbf{v_2}'\right|$$.

If the magnitude of v_{3} were to describe a measurable physical quantity, that would mean that the laws of physics would not appear the same if the universe was viewed in a mirror. In fact, this is exactly what happens in the weak interaction: Certain radioactive decays treat "left" and "right" differently, a phenomenon which can be traced to the summation of a polar vector with a pseudovector in the underlying theory. (See parity violation.)

=== Behavior under cross products and curls ===
Under inversion the two vectors change sign, but their cross product is invariant [black are the two original vectors, grey are the inverted vectors, and red is their mutual cross product].

For a rotation matrix R, either proper or improper, the following mathematical equation is always true:

$$(R\mathbf{v_1})\times(R\mathbf{v_2}) = (\det R)(R(\mathbf{v_1}\times\mathbf{v_2}))$$,

where v_{1} and v_{2} are any three-dimensional vectors. (This equation can be proven either through a geometric argument or through an algebraic calculation.) Similarly, if v is any vector field, the following equation is always true:

$$\nabla \times (R\mathbf{v}) = (\det R)(R(\nabla \times \mathbf{v}))$$

where ∇ × denotes the curl operation from vector calculus.

Suppose v_{1} and v_{2} are known polar vectors, and v_{3} is defined to be their cross product, v_{3} = v_{1} × v_{2}. If the universe is transformed by a rotation matrix R, then v_{3} is transformed to

$$\mathbf{v_3}' = \mathbf{v_1}' \times \mathbf{v_2}' = (R\mathbf{v_1}) \times (R\mathbf{v_2}) = (\det R)(R(\mathbf{v_1} \times \mathbf{v_2})) = (\det R)(R\mathbf{v_3}).$$

So v_{3} is a pseudovector. Likewise, one can show that the cross product of two pseudovectors is a pseudovector and the cross product of a polar vector with a pseudovector is a polar vector. In conclusion, we have:

- polar vector × polar vector = pseudovector
- pseudovector × pseudovector = pseudovector
- polar vector × pseudovector = polar vector
- pseudovector × polar vector = polar vector

This is isomorphic to addition modulo 2, where "polar" corresponds to 1 and "pseudo" to 0.

Similarly, if v_{1} is any known polar vector field and v_{2} is defined to be its curl v_{2} = ∇ × v_{1}, then if the universe is transformed by the rotation matrix R, v_{2} is transformed to

$$\mathbf{v_2}' = \nabla \times \mathbf{v_1}' = \nabla \times (R\mathbf{v_1}) = (\det R)(R(\nabla \times \mathbf{v_1})) = (\det R)(R\mathbf{v_2}).$$

So v_{2} is a pseudovector field. Likewise, one can show that the curl of a pseudovector field is a polar vector field. In conclusion, we have:

- ∇ × polar vector field = pseudovector field
- ∇ × pseudovector field = polar vector field

This is like the above rule for cross-products if one interprets the del operator ∇ as a polar vector.

=== Examples ===
From the definition, it is clear that linear displacement is a polar vector. Linear velocity is linear displacement (a polar vector) divided by time (a scalar), so is also a polar vector. Linear momentum is linear velocity (a polar vector) times mass (a scalar), so is a polar vector. Angular momentum (in a point object) is the cross product of linear displacement (a polar vector) and linear momentum (a polar vector), and is therefore a pseudovector. Torque is angular momentum (a pseudovector) divided by time (a scalar), so is also a pseudovector. Angular velocity (in a rotating body or fluid) is one-half times the curl of linear velocity (a polar vector field), and thus is a pseudovector. Continuing this way, it is straightforward to classify any of the common vectors in physics as either a pseudovector or a polar vector. (There are the parity-violating vectors in the theory of weak-interactions, which are neither polar vectors nor pseudovectors. However, these occur very rarely in physics.)

== The right-hand rule ==
Above, pseudovectors have been discussed using active transformations. An alternate approach, more along the lines of passive transformations, is to keep the universe fixed, but switch "right-hand rule" with "left-hand rule" everywhere in math and physics, including in the definition of the cross product and the curl. Any polar vector (e.g., a translation vector) would be unchanged, but pseudovectors (e.g., the magnetic field at a point) would switch signs. Nevertheless, there would be no physical consequences, apart from in the parity-violating phenomena such as certain radioactive decays.

== Formalization ==
One way to formalize pseudovectors is as follows: if V is an n-dimensional vector space, then a pseudovector of V is an element of the (n − 1)-th exterior power of V: ⋀^{n−1}(V). The pseudovectors of V form a vector space with the same dimension as V.

This definition is not equivalent to that requiring a sign flip under improper rotations, but it is general to all vector spaces. In particular, when n is even, such a pseudovector does not experience a sign flip, and when the characteristic of the underlying field of V is 2, a sign flip has no effect. Otherwise, the definitions are equivalent, though it should be borne in mind that without additional structure (specifically, either a volume form or an orientation), there is no natural identification of ⋀^{n−1}(V) with V.

Another way to formalize them is by considering them as elements of a representation space for $\text{O}(n)$. Vectors transform in the fundamental representation of $\text{O}(n)$ with data given by $(\mathbb{R}^n, \rho_{\text{fund}}, \text{O}(n))$, so that for any matrix $R$ in $\text{O}(n)$, one has $\rho_{\text{fund}}(R) = R$. Pseudovectors transform in a pseudofundamental representation $(\mathbb{R}^n, \rho_{\text{pseudo}}, \text{O}(n))$, with $\rho_{\text{pseudo}}(R) = \det(R)R$. Another way to view this homomorphism for $n$ odd is that in this case $\text{O}(n) \cong \text{SO}(n)\times \mathbb{Z}_2$. Then $\rho_{\text{pseudo}}$ is a direct product of group homomorphisms; it is the direct product of the fundamental homomorphism on $\text{SO}(n)$ with the trivial homomorphism on $\mathbb{Z}_2$.

== Geometric algebra ==
In geometric algebra the basic elements are vectors, and these are used to build a hierarchy of elements using the definitions of products in this algebra. In particular, the algebra builds pseudovectors from vectors.

The basic multiplication in the geometric algebra is the geometric product, denoted by simply juxtaposing two vectors as in ab. This product is expressed as:

$$\mathbf {ab} = \mathbf {a \cdot b} +\mathbf {a \wedge b} \ ,$$

where the leading term is the customary vector dot product and the second term is called the wedge product or exterior product. Using the postulates of the algebra, all combinations of dot and wedge products can be evaluated. A terminology to describe the various combinations is provided. For example, a multivector is a summation of k-fold wedge products of various k-values. A k-fold wedge product also is referred to as a k-blade.

In the present context the pseudovector is one of these combinations. This term is attached to a different multivector depending upon the dimensions of the space (that is, the number of linearly independent vectors in the space). In three dimensions, the most general 2-blade or bivector can be expressed as the wedge product of two vectors and is a pseudovector. In four dimensions, however, the pseudovectors are trivectors. In general, it is a (n − 1)-blade, where n is the dimension of the space and algebra. An n-dimensional space has n basis vectors and also n basis pseudovectors. Each basis pseudovector is formed from the outer (wedge) product of all but one of the n basis vectors. For instance, in four dimensions where the basis vectors are taken to be {e_{1}, e_{2}, e_{3}, e_{4}}, the pseudovectors can be written as: {e_{234}, e_{134}, e_{124}, e_{123}}.

=== Transformations in three dimensions ===
The transformation properties of the pseudovector in three dimensions has been compared to that of the vector cross product by Baylis. He says: "The terms axial vector and pseudovector are often treated as synonymous, but it is quite useful to be able to distinguish a bivector from its dual." To paraphrase Baylis: Given two polar vectors (that is, true vectors) a and b in three dimensions, the cross product composed from a and b is the vector normal to their plane given by c = a × b. Given a set of right-handed orthonormal basis vectors { e_{ℓ} }, the cross product is expressed in terms of its components as:

$$\mathbf {a} \times \mathbf{b} = \left(a^2b^3 - a^3b^2\right) \mathbf {e}_1 + \left(a^3b^1 - a^1b^3\right) \mathbf {e}_2 + \left(a^1b^2 - a^2b^1\right) \mathbf {e}_3 ,$$

where superscripts label vector components. On the other hand, the plane of the two vectors is represented by the exterior product or wedge product, denoted by a ∧ b. In this context of geometric algebra, this bivector is called a pseudovector, and is the Hodge dual of the cross product. The dual of e_{1} is introduced as e_{23} ≡ e_{2}e_{3} = e_{2} ∧ e_{3}, and so forth. That is, the dual of e_{1} is the subspace perpendicular to e_{1}, namely the subspace spanned by e_{2} and e_{3}. With this understanding,

$$\mathbf{a} \wedge \mathbf{b} = \left(a^2b^3 - a^3b^2\right) \mathbf {e}_{23} + \left(a^3b^1 - a^1b^3\right) \mathbf {e}_{31} + \left(a^1b^2 - a^2b^1\right) \mathbf {e}_{12} \ .$$

For details, see Hodge star operator § Three dimensions. The cross product and wedge product are related by:

$$\mathbf {a} \ \wedge \ \mathbf{b}  = \mathit i \ \mathbf {a} \ \times \ \mathbf{b} \ ,$$

where i = e_{1} ∧ e_{2} ∧ e_{3} is called the unit pseudoscalar. It has the property:

$$\mathit{i}^2 = -1 \ .$$

Using the above relations, it is seen that if the vectors a and b are inverted by changing the signs of their components while leaving the basis vectors fixed, both the pseudovector and the cross product are invariant. On the other hand, if the components are fixed and the basis vectors e_{ℓ} are inverted, then the pseudovector is invariant, but the cross product changes sign. This behavior of cross products is consistent with their definition as vector-like elements that change sign under transformation from a right-handed to a left-handed coordinate system, unlike polar vectors.

=== Note on usage ===
As an aside, it may be noted that not all authors in the field of geometric algebra use the term pseudovector, and some authors follow the terminology that does not distinguish between the pseudovector and the cross product. However, because the cross product does not generalize to other than three dimensions, the notion of pseudovector based upon the cross product also cannot be extended to a space of any other number of dimensions. The pseudovector as a (n – 1)-blade in an n-dimensional space is not restricted in this way.

Another important note is that pseudovectors, despite their name, are "vectors" in the sense of being elements of a vector space. The idea that "a pseudovector is different from a vector" is only true with a different and more specific definition of the term "vector" as discussed above.

== See also ==
- Exterior algebra
- Clifford algebra
- Antivector, a generalization of pseudovector in Clifford algebra
- Orientability — discussion about non-orientable spaces.
- Tensor density
