= Multivector field =

In differential geometry, a field in mathematics, a multivector field, polyvector field of degree $k$, or $k$-vector field, on a smooth manifold $M$, is a generalization of the notion of a vector field on a manifold.

== Definition ==
A multivector field of degree $k$ is a global section $X$ of the kth exterior power $\wedge^k TM \to M$ of the tangent bundle, i.e. $X$ assigns to each point $p \in M$ a $k$-vector in $\wedge^k T_p M$.

The set of all multivector fields of degree $k$ on $M$ is denoted by $\mathfrak{X}^k (M) := \Gamma (\wedge^k TM)$ or by $T^k_{\rm poly}(M)$.

=== Particular cases ===
- If $k=0$ one has $\mathfrak{X}^0 (M) := \mathcal{C}^\infty(M)$;
- If $k=1$, one has $\mathfrak{X}^1 (M) := \mathfrak{X}(M)$, i.e. one recovers the notion of vector field;
- If $k > \mathrm{dim} (M)$, one has $\mathfrak{X}^k (M) := \{0\}$, since $\wedge^k TM = 0$.

== Algebraic structures ==
The set $\mathfrak{X}^k (M)$ of multivector fields is an $\mathbb{R}$-vector space for every $k$, so that $\mathfrak{X}^\bullet (M) = \bigoplus_k \mathfrak{X}^k (M)$ is a graded vector space.

Furthermore, there is a wedge product

$$\wedge: \mathfrak{X}^k (M) \times \mathfrak{X}^l (M) \to \mathfrak{X}^{k+l} (M)$$

which for $k=0$ and $l=1$ recovers the standard action of smooth functions on vector fields. Such product is associative and graded commutative, making $(\mathfrak{X}^\bullet (M), \wedge)$ into a graded commutative algebra.

Similarly, the Lie bracket of vector fields extends to the so-called Schouten-Nijenhuis bracket

$$[\cdot,\cdot]: \mathfrak{X}^k (M) \times \mathfrak{X}^l (M) \to \mathfrak{X}^{k+l-1} (M)$$

which is $\mathbb{R}$-bilinear, graded skew-symmetric and satisfies the graded version of the Jacobi identity. Furthermore, it satisfies a graded version of the Leibniz identity, i.e. it is compatible with the wedge product, making the triple $(\mathfrak{X}^\bullet (M), \wedge, [\cdot,\cdot])$ into a Gerstenhaber algebra.

== Comparison with differential forms ==
Since the tangent bundle is dual to the cotangent bundle, multivector fields of degree $k$ are dual to $k$-forms, and both are subsumed in the general concept of a tensor field, which is a section of some tensor bundle, often consisting of exterior powers of the tangent and cotangent bundles. A $(k,0)$-tensor field is a differential $k$-form, a $(0,1)$-tensor field is a vector field, and a $(0,k)$-tensor field is $k$-vector field.

While differential forms are widely studied as such in differential geometry and differential topology, multivector fields are often encountered as tensor fields of type $(0,k)$, except in the context of the geometric algebra (see also Clifford algebra).

== See also ==
- Multivector
- Blade (geometry)
