= Antivector =

An antivector is an element of grade n − 1 in an n-dimensional exterior algebra. An antivector is always a blade, and it gets its name from the fact that its components each involve a combination of all except one basis vector, thus being the opposite of a vector whose components each involve exactly one basis vector. Like a vector, an antivector has n components in n-dimensional space, and this sometimes leads to an inadequate distinction being made between the two types of entities. However, antivectors transform differently with a change of basis than vectors do, which shows that they are different kinds of quantities.

In physics, the names pseudovector and axial vector are used to describe vectors that transform in the same way that an antivector transforms. These typically arise as the result of cross products between two vectors.

== See also ==
- Exterior algebra
- Geometric algebra
