= Exterior calculus identities =

This article summarizes several identities in exterior calculus, a mathematical calculus used in differential geometry.

== Notation ==
The following notation is used in this article.

=== Manifold ===
$M$, $N$ are $n$-dimensional smooth manifolds, where $n\in \mathbb{N}$. That is, differentiable manifolds that can be differentiated enough times for the purposes on this page.

$p \in M$, $q \in N$ denote one point on each of the manifolds.

The boundary of a manifold $M$ is a manifold $\partial M$, which has dimension $n - 1$. An orientation on $M$ induces an orientation on $\partial M$.

We usually denote a submanifold by $\Sigma \subset M$.

=== Tangent and cotangent bundles ===
$TM$, $T^{*}M$ denote the tangent bundle and cotangent bundle, respectively, of the smooth manifold $M$.

$T_p M$, $T_q N$ denote the tangent spaces of $M$, $N$ at the points $p$, $q$, respectively. $T^{*}_p M$ denotes the cotangent space of $M$ at the point $p$.

Sections of the tangent bundles, also known as vector fields, are typically denoted as $X, Y, Z \in \Gamma(TM)$ such that at a point $p \in M$ we have $X|_p, Y|_p, Z|_p \in T_p M$. Sections of the cotangent bundle, also known as differential 1-forms (or covector fields), are typically denoted as $\alpha, \beta \in \Gamma(T^{*}M)$ such that at a point $p \in M$ we have $\alpha|_p, \beta|_p \in T^{*}_p M$. An alternative notation for $\Gamma(T^{*}M)$ is $\Omega^1(M)$.

=== Differential k-forms ===
Differential $k$-forms, which we refer to simply as $k$-forms here, are differential forms defined on $TM$. We denote the set of all $k$-forms as $\Omega^k(M)$. For $0\leq k,\ l,\ m\leq n$ we usually write $\alpha\in\Omega^k(M)$, $\beta\in\Omega^l(M)$, $\gamma\in\Omega^m(M)$.

$0$-forms $f\in\Omega^0(M)$ are just scalar functions $C^{\infty}(M)$ on $M$. $\mathbf{1}\in\Omega^0(M)$ denotes the constant $0$-form equal to $1$ everywhere.

=== Omitted elements of a sequence ===
When we are given $(k+1)$ inputs $X_0,\ldots,X_k$ and a $k$-form $\alpha\in\Omega^k(M)$ we denote omission of the $i$th entry by writing

$$\alpha(X_0,\ldots,\hat{X}_i,\ldots,X_k):=\alpha(X_0,\ldots,X_{i-1},X_{i+1},\ldots,X_k) .$$

=== Exterior product ===
The exterior product is also known as the wedge product. It is denoted by $\wedge : \Omega^k(M) \times \Omega^l(M) \rightarrow \Omega^{k+l}(M)$. The exterior product of a $k$-form $\alpha\in\Omega^k(M)$ and an $l$-form $\beta\in\Omega^l(M)$ produce a $(k+l)$-form $\alpha\wedge\beta \in\Omega^{k+l}(M)$. It can be written using the set $S(k,k+l)$ of all permutations $\sigma$ of $\{1,\ldots,n\}$ such that $\sigma(1)<\ldots <\sigma(k), \ \sigma(k+1)<\ldots <\sigma(k+l)$ as

$$(\alpha\wedge\beta)(X_1,\ldots,X_{k+l})=\sum_{\sigma\in S(k,k+l)}\text{sign}(\sigma)\alpha(X_{\sigma(1)},\ldots,X_{\sigma(k)})\otimes\beta(X_{\sigma(k+1)},\ldots,X_{\sigma(k+l)}) .$$

=== Directional derivative ===
The directional derivative of a 0-form $f\in\Omega^0(M)$ along a section $X\in\Gamma(TM)$ is a 0-form denoted $\partial_X f .$

=== Exterior derivative ===
The exterior derivative $d_k : \Omega^k(M) \rightarrow \Omega^{k+1}(M)$ is defined for all $0 \leq k\leq n$. We generally omit the subscript when it is clear from the context.

For a $0$-form $f\in\Omega^0(M)$ we have $d_0f\in\Omega^1(M)$ as the $1$-form that gives the directional derivative, i.e., for the section $X\in \Gamma(TM)$ we have $(d_0f)(X) = \partial_X f$, the directional derivative of $f$ along $X$.

For $0 < k\leq n$,

$$(d_k\omega)(X_0,\ldots,X_k)=\sum_{0\leq j\leq k}(-1)^jd_{0}(\omega(X_0,\ldots,\hat{X}_j,\ldots,X_k))(X_j) + \sum_{0\leq i < j\leq k}(-1)^{i+j}\omega([X_i,X_j],X_0,\ldots,\hat{X}_i,\ldots,\hat{X}_j,\ldots,X_k) .$$

=== Lie bracket ===
The Lie bracket of sections $X,Y \in \Gamma(TM)$ is defined as the unique section $[X,Y] \in \Gamma(TM)$ that satisfies

$$\forall f\in\Omega^0(M) \Rightarrow \partial_{[X,Y]}f = \partial_X \partial_Y f - \partial_Y \partial_X f .$$

=== Tangent maps ===
If $\phi : M \rightarrow N$ is a smooth map, then $d\phi|_p:T_pM\rightarrow T_{\phi(p)}N$ defines a tangent map from $M$ to $N$. It is defined through curves $\gamma$ on $M$ with derivative $\gamma'(0)=X\in T_pM$ such that

$$d\phi(X):=(\phi\circ\gamma)' .$$

Note that $\phi$ is a $0$-form with values in $N$.

=== Pull-back ===
If $\phi : M \rightarrow N$ is a smooth map, then the pull-back of a $k$-form $\alpha\in \Omega^k(N)$ is defined such that for any $k$-dimensional submanifold $\Sigma\subset M$

$$\int_{\Sigma} \phi^*\alpha = \int_{\phi(\Sigma)} \alpha .$$

The pull-back can also be expressed as

$$(\phi^*\alpha)(X_1,\ldots,X_k)=\alpha(d\phi(X_1),\ldots,d\phi(X_k)) .$$

=== Interior product ===
Also known as the interior derivative, the interior product given a section $Y\in \Gamma(TM)$ is a map $\iota_Y:\Omega^{k+1}(M) \rightarrow \Omega^k(M)$ that effectively substitutes the first input of a $(k+1)$-form with $Y$. If $\alpha\in\Omega^{k+1}(M)$ and $X_i\in \Gamma(TM)$ then

$$(\iota_Y\alpha)(X_1,\ldots,X_k) = \alpha(Y,X_1,\ldots,X_k) .$$

=== Metric tensor ===
Given a nondegenerate bilinear form $g_p( \cdot , \cdot )$ on each $T_p M$ that is continuous on $M$, the manifold becomes a pseudo-Riemannian manifold. We denote the metric tensor $g$, defined pointwise by $g( X , Y )|_p = g_p( X|_p , Y|_p )$. We call $s=\operatorname{sign}(g)$ the signature of the metric. A Riemannian manifold has $s=1$, whereas Minkowski space has $s=-1$.

=== Musical isomorphisms ===
The metric tensor $g(\cdot,\cdot)$ induces duality mappings between vector fields and one-forms: these are the musical isomorphisms flat $\flat$ and sharp $\sharp$. A section $A \in \Gamma(TM)$ corresponds to the unique one-form $A^{\flat}\in\Omega^1(M)$ such that for all sections $X \in \Gamma(TM)$, we have:

$$A^{\flat}(X) = g(A,X) .$$

A one-form $\alpha\in\Omega^1(M)$ corresponds to the unique vector field $\alpha^{\sharp}\in \Gamma(TM)$ such that for all $X \in \Gamma(TM)$, we have:

$$\alpha(X) = g(\alpha^\sharp,X) .$$

These mappings extend via multilinearity to mappings from $k$-vector fields to $k$-forms and $k$-forms to $k$-vector fields through

$$\begin{align}
(A_1 \wedge A_2 \wedge \cdots \wedge A_k)^{\flat} &= A_1^{\flat} \wedge A_2^{\flat} \wedge \cdots \wedge A_k^{\flat} \\
(\alpha_1 \wedge \alpha_2 \wedge \cdots \wedge \alpha_k)^{\sharp} &= \alpha_1^{\sharp} \wedge \alpha_2^{\sharp} \wedge \cdots \wedge \alpha_k^{\sharp}.
\end{align}$$

=== Hodge star ===
For an n-manifold M, the Hodge star operator ${\star}:\Omega^k(M)\rightarrow\Omega^{n-k}(M)$ is a duality mapping taking a $k$-form $\alpha \in \Omega^k(M)$ to an $(n{-}k)$-form $({\star}\alpha) \in \Omega^{n-k}(M)$.

It can be defined in terms of an oriented frame $(X_1,\ldots,X_n)$ for $TM$, orthonormal with respect to the given metric tensor $g$:

$$({\star}\alpha)(X_1,\ldots,X_{n-k})=\alpha(X_{n-k+1},\ldots,X_n) .$$

=== Co-differential operator ===
The co-differential operator $\delta:\Omega^k(M)\rightarrow\Omega^{k-1}(M)$ on an $n$ dimensional manifold $M$ is defined by

$$\delta := (-1)^{k} {\star}^{-1} d {\star} = (-1)^{nk+n+1}{\star} d {\star} .$$

The Hodge–Dirac operator, $d+\delta$, is a Dirac operator studied in Clifford analysis.

=== Oriented manifold ===
An $n$-dimensional orientable manifold M is a manifold that can be equipped with a choice of an n-form $\mu\in\Omega^n(M)$ that is continuous and nonzero everywhere on M.

=== Volume form ===
On an orientable manifold $M$ the canonical choice of a volume form given a metric tensor $g$ and an orientation is $\mathbf{det}:=\sqrt{|\det g|}\;dX_1^{\flat}\wedge\ldots\wedge dX_n^{\flat}$ for any basis $dX_1,\ldots, dX_n$ ordered to match the orientation.

=== Area form ===
Given a volume form $\mathbf{det}$ and a unit normal vector $N$ we can also define an area form $\sigma:=\iota_N\textbf{det}$ on the boundary $\partial M.$

=== Bilinear form on k-forms ===
A generalization of the metric tensor, the symmetric bilinear form between two $k$-forms $\alpha,\beta\in\Omega^k(M)$, is defined pointwise on $M$ by

$$\langle\alpha,\beta\rangle|_p := {\star}(\alpha\wedge {\star}\beta )|_p .$$

The $L^2$-bilinear form for the space of $k$-forms $\Omega^k(M)$ is defined by

$$\langle\!\langle\alpha,\beta\rangle\!\rangle:= \int_M\alpha\wedge {\star}\beta .$$

In the case of a Riemannian manifold, each is an inner product (i.e. is positive-definite).

=== Lie derivative ===
We define the Lie derivative $\mathcal{L}:\Omega^k(M)\rightarrow\Omega^k(M)$ through Cartan's magic formula for a given section $X\in \Gamma(TM)$ as

$$\mathcal{L}_X = d \circ \iota_X + \iota_X \circ d .$$

It describes the change of a $k$-form along a flow $\phi_t$ associated to the section $X$.

=== Laplace–Beltrami operator ===
The Laplacian $\Delta:\Omega^k(M) \rightarrow \Omega^k(M)$ is defined as $\Delta = -(d\delta + \delta d)$.

== Important definitions ==
=== Definitions on Ω^{k}(M) ===
$\alpha\in\Omega^k(M)$ is called...

- closed if $d\alpha=0$
- exact if $\alpha = d\beta$ for some $\beta\in\Omega^{k-1}$
- coclosed if $\delta\alpha=0$
- coexact if $\alpha = \delta\beta$ for some $\beta\in\Omega^{k+1}$
- harmonic if closed and coclosed

=== Cohomology ===
The $k$-th cohomology of a manifold $M$ and its exterior derivative operators $d_0,\ldots,d_{n-1}$ is given by

$$H^k(M):=\frac{\text{ker}(d_{k})}{\text{im}(d_{k-1})}$$

Two closed $k$-forms $\alpha,\beta\in\Omega^k(M)$ are in the same cohomology class if their difference is an exact form i.e.

$$[\alpha]=[\beta] \ \ \Longleftrightarrow\ \ \alpha{-}\beta = d\eta \ \text{ for some }  \eta\in\Omega^{k-1}(M)$$

A closed surface of genus $g$ will have $2g$ generators which are harmonic.

=== Dirichlet energy ===
Given $\alpha\in\Omega^k(M)$, its Dirichlet energy is

$$\mathcal{E}_\text{D}(\alpha):= \dfrac{1}{2}\langle\!\langle d\alpha,d\alpha\rangle\!\rangle + \dfrac{1}{2}\langle\!\langle \delta\alpha,\delta\alpha\rangle\!\rangle$$

== Properties ==
=== Exterior derivative properties ===
- $\int_{\Sigma} d\alpha = \int_{\partial\Sigma} \alpha$ ( Stokes' theorem )
- $d \circ d = 0$ ( cochain complex )
- $d(\alpha \wedge \beta ) = d\alpha\wedge \beta +(-1)^k\alpha\wedge d\beta$ for $\alpha\in\Omega^k(M), \ \beta\in\Omega^l(M)$ ( Leibniz rule )
- $df(X) = \partial_X f$ for $f\in\Omega^0(M), \ X\in \Gamma(TM)$ ( directional derivative )
- $d\alpha = 0$ for $\alpha \in \Omega^n(M), \ \text{dim}(M)=n$

=== Exterior product properties ===
- $\alpha \wedge \beta = (-1)^{kl}\beta \wedge \alpha$ for $\alpha\in\Omega^k(M), \ \beta\in\Omega^l(M)$ ( alternating )
- $(\alpha \wedge \beta)\wedge\gamma = \alpha \wedge (\beta\wedge\gamma)$ ( associativity )
- $(\lambda\alpha) \wedge \beta = \lambda (\alpha \wedge \beta)$ for $\lambda\in\mathbb{R}$ ( compatibility of scalar multiplication )
- $\alpha \wedge ( \beta_1 + \beta_2 ) = \alpha \wedge \beta_1 + \alpha \wedge \beta_2$ ( distributivity over addition )
- $\alpha \wedge \alpha = 0$ for $\alpha\in\Omega^k(M)$ when $k$ is odd or $\operatorname{rank} \alpha \le 1$. The rank of a $k$-form $\alpha$ means the minimum number of monomial terms (exterior products of one-forms) that must be summed to produce $\alpha$.

=== Pull-back properties ===
- $d(\phi^*\alpha) = \phi^*(d\alpha)$ ( commutative with $d$ )
- $\phi^*(\alpha\wedge\beta) = (\phi^*\alpha)\wedge(\phi^*\beta)$ ( distributes over $\wedge$ )
- $(\phi_1\circ\phi_2)^* = \phi_2^*\phi_1^*$ ( contravariant )
- $\phi^*f=f\circ\phi$ for $f\in\Omega^0(N)$ ( function composition )

=== Musical isomorphism properties ===
- $(X^{\flat})^{\sharp}=X$
- $(\alpha^{\sharp})^{\flat}=\alpha$

=== Interior product properties ===
- $\iota_X \circ \iota_X = 0$ ( nilpotent )
- $\iota_X \circ \iota_Y = - \iota_Y \circ \iota_X$
- $\iota_X (\alpha \wedge \beta ) = (\iota_X\alpha)\wedge\beta + (-1)^k\alpha\wedge(\iota_X \beta )$ for $\alpha\in\Omega^k(M), \ \beta\in\Omega^l(M)$ ( Leibniz rule )
- $\iota_X\alpha = \alpha(X)$ for $\alpha\in\Omega^1(M)$
- $\iota_X f = 0$ for $f \in \Omega^0(M)$
- $\iota_X(f\alpha) = f \iota_X\alpha$ for $f \in \Omega^0(M)$

=== Hodge star properties ===
- ${\star}(\lambda_1\alpha + \lambda_2\beta) = \lambda_1({\star}\alpha) + \lambda_2({\star}\beta)$ for $\lambda_1,\lambda_2\in\mathbb{R}$ ( linearity )
- ${\star}{\star}\alpha = s(-1)^{k(n-k)}\alpha$ for $\alpha\in \Omega^k(M)$, $n=\dim(M)$, and $s = \operatorname{sign}(g)$ the sign of the metric
- ${\star}^{(-1)} = s(-1)^{k(n-k)}{\star}$ ( inversion )
- ${\star}(f\alpha)=f({\star}\alpha)$ for $f\in\Omega^0(M)$ ( commutative with $0$-forms )
- $\langle\!\langle\alpha,\alpha\rangle\!\rangle = \langle\!\langle{\star}\alpha,{\star}\alpha\rangle\!\rangle$ for $\alpha\in\Omega^1(M)$ ( Hodge star preserves $1$-form norm )
- ${\star} \mathbf{1} = \mathbf{det}$ ( Hodge dual of constant function 1 is the volume form )

=== Co-differential operator properties ===
- $\delta\circ\delta = 0$ ( nilpotent )
- ${\star}\delta=(-1)^kd{\star}$ and ${\star} d = (-1)^{k+1}\delta{\star}$ ( Hodge adjoint to $d$ )
- $\langle\!\langle d\alpha,\beta\rangle\!\rangle = \langle\!\langle \alpha,\delta\beta\rangle\!\rangle$ if $\partial M=0$ ( $\delta$ adjoint to $d$ )
- In general, $\int_M d\alpha \wedge \star \beta = \int_{\partial M} \alpha \wedge \star \beta + \int_M \alpha\wedge\star\delta\beta$
- $\delta f = 0$ for $f \in \Omega^0(M)$

=== Lie derivative properties ===
- $d\circ\mathcal{L}_X = \mathcal{L}_X\circ d$ ( commutative with $d$ )
- $\iota_X \circ\mathcal{L}_X = \mathcal{L}_X\circ \iota_X$ ( commutative with $\iota_X$ )
- $\mathcal{L}_X(\iota_Y\alpha) = \iota_{[X,Y]}\alpha + \iota_Y\mathcal{L}_X\alpha$
- $\mathcal{L}_X(\alpha\wedge\beta) = (\mathcal{L}_X\alpha)\wedge\beta + \alpha\wedge(\mathcal{L}_X\beta)$ ( Leibniz rule )

== Exterior calculus identities ==
- $\iota_X({\star}\mathbf{1}) = {\star} X^{\flat}$
- $\iota_X({\star}\alpha) = (-1)^k{\star}(X^{\flat}\wedge\alpha)$ if $\alpha\in\Omega^k(M)$
- $\iota_X(\phi^*\alpha)=\phi^*(\iota_{d\phi(X)}\alpha)$
- $\nu,\mu\in\Omega^n(M), \mu \text{ non-zero } \ \Rightarrow \ \exist \ f\in\Omega^0(M): \ \nu=f\mu$
- $X^{\flat}\wedge{\star} Y^{\flat} = g(X,Y)( {\star} \mathbf{1})$ ( bilinear form )
- $[X,[Y,Z]]+[Y,[Z,X]]+[Z,[X,Y]] = 0$ ( Jacobi identity )

=== Dimensions ===
If $n=\dim M$

- $\dim\Omega^k(M) = \binom{n}{k}$ for $0\leq k\leq n$
- $\dim\Omega^k(M) = 0$ for $k < 0, \ k > n$

If $X_1,\ldots,X_n\in \Gamma(TM)$ is a basis, then a basis of $\Omega^k(M)$ is
$$\{X_{\sigma(1)}^{\flat}\wedge\ldots\wedge X_{\sigma(k)}^{\flat} \ : \ \sigma\in S(k,n)\}$$

=== Exterior products ===
Let $\alpha, \beta, \gamma,\alpha_i\in \Omega^1(M)$ and $X,Y,Z,X_i$ be vector fields.

1. $$\alpha(X) = \det
\begin{bmatrix}
\alpha(X) \\
\end{bmatrix}$$
2. $$(\alpha\wedge\beta)(X,Y) = \det
\begin{bmatrix}
\alpha(X) & \alpha(Y) \\
\beta(X)  & \beta(Y) \\
\end{bmatrix}$$
3. $$(\alpha\wedge\beta\wedge\gamma)(X,Y,Z) = \det
\begin{bmatrix}
\alpha(X) & \alpha(Y) & \alpha(Z) \\
\beta(X)  & \beta(Y)  & \beta(Z) \\
\gamma(X) & \gamma(Y) & \gamma(Z)
\end{bmatrix}$$
4. $$(\alpha_1\wedge\ldots\wedge\alpha_l)(X_1,\ldots,X_l) = \det
\begin{bmatrix}
\alpha_1(X_1) & \alpha_1(X_2) & \dots & \alpha_1(X_l) \\
\alpha_2(X_1) & \alpha_2(X_2) & \dots & \alpha_2(X_l) \\
\vdots & \vdots & \ddots & \vdots \\
\alpha_l(X_1) & \alpha_l(X_2) & \dots & \alpha_l(X_l)
\end{bmatrix}$$

=== Projection and rejection ===
- $(-1)^k\iota_X{\star}\alpha = {\star}(X^{\flat}\wedge\alpha)$ ( interior product $\iota_X{\star}$ dual to wedge $X^{\flat}\wedge$ )
- $(\iota_X\alpha)\wedge{\star}\beta =\alpha\wedge{\star}(X^{\flat}\wedge\beta)$ for $\alpha\in\Omega^{k+1}(M),\beta\in\Omega^k(M)$

If $|X|=1, \ \alpha\in\Omega^k(M)$, then

- $\iota_X\circ (X^{\flat}\wedge ):\Omega^k(M)\rightarrow\Omega^k(M)$ is the projection of $\alpha$ onto the orthogonal complement of $X$.
- $(X^{\flat}\wedge )\circ \iota_X:\Omega^k(M)\rightarrow\Omega^k(M)$ is the rejection of $\alpha$, the remainder of the projection.
- thus $\iota_X \circ (X^{\flat}\wedge ) + (X^{\flat}\wedge)\circ\iota_X = \text{id}$ ( projection–rejection decomposition )

Given the boundary $\partial M$ with unit normal vector $N$

- $\mathbf{t}:=\iota_N\circ (N^{\flat}\wedge )$ extracts the tangential component of the boundary.
- $\mathbf{n}:=(\text{id}-\mathbf{t})$ extracts the normal component of the boundary.

=== Sum expressions ===
- $(d\alpha)(X_0,\ldots,X_k)=\sum_{0\leq j\leq k}(-1)^jd(\alpha(X_0,\ldots,\hat{X}_j,\ldots,X_k))(X_j) + \sum_{0\leq i < j\leq k}(-1)^{i+j}\alpha([X_i,X_j],X_0,\ldots,\hat{X}_i,\ldots,\hat{X}_j,\ldots,X_k)$
- $(d\alpha)(X_1,\ldots,X_k) =\sum_{i=1}^k(-1)^{i+1}(\nabla_{X_i}\alpha)(X_1,\ldots,\hat{X}_i,\ldots,X_k)$
- $(\delta\alpha)(X_1,\ldots,X_{k-1})=-\sum_{i=1}^n(\iota_{E_i}(\nabla_{E_i}\alpha))(X_1,\ldots,\hat{X}_i,\ldots,X_k)$ given a positively oriented orthonormal frame $E_1,\ldots,E_n$.
- $(\mathcal{L}_Y\alpha)(X_1,\ldots,X_k) =(\nabla_Y\alpha)(X_1,\ldots,X_k) - \sum_{i=1}^k\alpha(X_1,\ldots,\nabla_{X_i}Y,\ldots,X_k)$

=== Hodge decomposition ===
If $\partial M =\empty$, $\omega\in\Omega^k(M) \Rightarrow \exists \alpha\in\Omega^{k-1}, \ \beta\in\Omega^{k+1}, \ \gamma\in\Omega^k(M), \ d\gamma=0, \ \delta\gamma = 0$ such that

$$\omega = d\alpha + \delta\beta + \gamma$$

=== Poincaré lemma ===
If a boundaryless manifold $M$ has trivial cohomology $H^k(M)=\{0\}$, then any closed $\omega\in\Omega^k(M)$ is exact. This is the case if M is contractible.

== Relations to vector calculus ==
=== Identities in Euclidean 3-space ===
Let Euclidean metric $g(X,Y):=\langle X,Y\rangle = X\cdot Y$.

We use $\nabla = \left( {\partial \over \partial x}, {\partial \over \partial y}, {\partial \over \partial z} \right)$ differential operator $\mathbb{R}^3$

- $\iota_X\alpha = g(X,\alpha^{\sharp}) = X\cdot \alpha^{\sharp}$ for $\alpha\in\Omega^1(M)$.
- $\mathbf{det}(X,Y,Z)=\langle X,Y\times Z\rangle = \langle X\times Y,Z\rangle$ ( scalar triple product )
- $X\times Y = ({\star}(X^{\flat}\wedge Y^{\flat}))^{\sharp}$ ( cross product )
- $\iota_X\alpha=-(X\times A)^{\flat}$ if $\alpha\in\Omega^2(M),\ A=({\star}\alpha)^{\sharp}$
- $X\cdot Y = {\star}(X^{\flat}\wedge {\star} Y^{\flat})$ ( scalar product )
- $\nabla f=(df)^{\sharp}$ ( gradient )
- $X\cdot\nabla f=df(X)$ ( directional derivative )
- $\nabla\cdot X = {\star} d {\star} X^{\flat} = -\delta X^{\flat}$ ( divergence )
- $\nabla\times X = ({\star} d X^{\flat})^{\sharp}$ ( curl )
- $\langle X,N\rangle\sigma = {\star} X^\flat$ where $N$ is the unit normal vector of $\partial M$ and $\sigma=\iota_{N}\mathbf{det}$ is the area form on $\partial M$.
- $\int_{\Sigma} d{\star} X^{\flat} = \int_{\partial\Sigma}{\star} X^{\flat} = \int_{\partial\Sigma}\langle X,N\rangle\sigma$ ( divergence theorem )

=== Lie derivatives ===
- $\mathcal{L}_X f =X\cdot \nabla f$ ( $0$-forms )
- $\mathcal{L}_X \alpha = (\nabla_X\alpha^{\sharp})^{\flat} +g(\alpha^{\sharp},\nabla X)$ ( $1$-forms )
- ${\star}\mathcal{L}_X\beta = \left( \nabla_XB - \nabla_BX + (\text{div}X)B \right)^{\flat}$ if $B=({\star}\beta)^{\sharp}$ ( $2$-forms on $3$-manifolds )
- ${\star}\mathcal{L}_X\rho = dq(X)+(\text{div}X)q$ if $\rho={\star} q \in \Omega^0(M)$ ( $n$-forms )
- $\mathcal{L}_X(\mathbf{det})=(\text{div}(X))\mathbf{det}$
