= Blade (geometry) =

Exterior product of vectors

Relations between scalars, vectors, $k$-blades (simple $k$-vectors), and $k$-vectors.

In the study of geometric algebras, a k-blade or a simple k-vector is a generalization of the concept of scalars and vectors to include simple bivectors, trivectors, etc. Specifically, a k-blade is a k-vector that can be expressed as the exterior product (informally wedge product) of 1-vectors, and is of grade k.

In detail:

- A 0-blade is a scalar.
- A 1-blade is a vector. Every vector is simple.
- A 2-blade is a simple bivector. Sums of 2-blades are also bivectors, but not always simple. A 2-blade may be expressed as the wedge product of two vectors a and b:
  $$a \wedge b .$$
- A 3-blade is a simple trivector, that is, it may be expressed as the wedge product of three vectors a, b, and c:
  $$a \wedge b \wedge c.$$
- In vector spaces of dimension ≤ 3, every k-vector is a blade. In dimension ≥ 4, there exist k-vectors (starting already at grade 2) that are not blades. This makes the distinction important, because in higher dimensions most k-vectors do not correspond to any subspace, which requires defining blades separately from k-vectors to identify the k-vectors that actually do.
- In a vector space of dimension n, a blade of grade n − 1 is called a pseudovector or an antivector.
- The highest grade element in a space is called a pseudoscalar, and in a space of dimension n is an n-blade.
- In a vector space of dimension n, there are k(n − k) + 1 dimensions of freedom in choosing a k-blade for 0 ≤ k ≤ n, of which one dimension is an overall scaling multiplier.

A vector subspace of finite dimension k may be represented by the k-blade formed as a wedge product of all the elements of a basis for that subspace. Indeed, a k-blade is naturally equivalent to a k-subspace, up to a scalar factor. When the space is endowed with a volume form (an alternating k-multilinear scalar-valued function), such a k-blade may be normalized to take unit value, making the correspondence unique up to a sign.

== Examples ==
In two-dimensional space, scalars are described as 0-blades, vectors are 1-blades, and area elements are 2-blades in this context known as pseudoscalars, in that they are elements of a one-dimensional space that is distinct from regular scalars.

In three-dimensional space, 0-blades are again scalars and 1-blades are three-dimensional vectors, while 2-blades are oriented area elements. In this case 3-blades are called pseudoscalars and represent three-dimensional volume elements, which form a one-dimensional vector space similar to scalars. Unlike scalars, 3-blades transform according to the Jacobian determinant of a change-of-coordinate function.

== See also ==
- Grassmannian
- Multivector
- Exterior algebra
- Differential form
- Geometric algebra
- Clifford algebra
