= Cross product (disambiguation) =

The cross product is a product in vector algebra.

Cross product may also refer to:

- Seven-dimensional cross product, a related product in seven dimensions
- A product in a Künneth theorem
- A crossed product in von Neumann algebras
- A Cartesian product in set theory

== See also ==
- Cross-multiplication
