= Polar sine =

Generalizes sine function to polytopes

In geometry, the polar sine (denoted psin) generalizes the sine function of angle to the vertex angle of a polytope.

== Definition ==
=== n vectors in n-dimensional space ===
The interpretations of 3D volumes for left: a parallelepiped (Ω in polar sine definition) and right: a cuboid (Π in definition). The interpretation is similar in higher dimensions.

In the case n = 2, the polar sine of two vectors v_{1}, v_{2} in R^{2} is the ordinary sine of the angle that is swept out if the first vector is rotated counterclockwise to the position of the second vector. However the polar signe is well defined for any positive integer n.

==== Definition 1 ====
Let v_{1}, ..., v_{n} (n ≥ 1) be non-zero Euclidean vectors in n-dimensional space (R^{n}) that are directed from a vertex of a parallelotope, forming the edges of the parallelotope. The polar sine of the vertex angle is:

$$\operatorname{psin}(\mathbf{v}_1,\dots,\mathbf{v}_n) = \frac{\Omega}{\Pi},$$

where the numerator is the determinant

$$\begin{align}
\Omega & = \det\begin{bmatrix}\mathbf{v}_1 & \mathbf{v}_2 & \cdots & \mathbf{v}_n \end{bmatrix} =
\begin{vmatrix}
v_{11} & v_{21} & \cdots & v_{n1} \\
v_{12} & v_{22} & \cdots & v_{n2} \\
\vdots & \vdots & \ddots & \vdots \\
v_{1n} & v_{2n} & \cdots & v_{nn} \\
\end{vmatrix}
\end{align}\,,$$

which equals the signed hypervolume of the parallelotope with vector edges

$$\begin{align}
\mathbf{v}_1 &= (v_{11}, v_{12}, \dots, v_{1n})^T \\
\mathbf{v}_2 &= (v_{21}, v_{22}, \dots, v_{2n})^T \\
& \,\,\,\vdots \\
\mathbf{v}_n &= (v_{n1}, v_{n2}, \dots, v_{nn})^T\,, \\
\end{align}$$

and where the denominator is the n-fold product

$$\Pi = \prod_{i=1}^n \|\mathbf{v}_i\|$$

of the magnitudes of the vectors, which equals the hypervolume of the n-dimensional hyperrectangle with edges equal to the magnitudes of the vectors ||v_{1}||, ||v_{2}||, ... ||v_{n}|| rather than the vectors themselves. Also see Ericksson.

The parallelotope's hypervolume will be less than or equal to the hyperrectangle's volume by Hadamard's inequality, meaning (see image for the 3d case):

$$|\Omega| \leq \Pi \implies \frac{|\Omega|}{\Pi} \leq 1 \implies -1 \leq \operatorname{psin}(\mathbf{v}_1,\dots,\mathbf{v}_n) \leq 1\,,$$

as for the ordinary sine, with either bound being reached only in the case that all vectors are mutually orthogonal.

==== Definition 2 ====
Equivalently, let v_{1}, ..., v_{n} (n ≥ 1) be non-zero Euclidean vectors in n-dimensional space (R^{n}) that are directed from a vertex of a parallelotope, forming the edges of the parallelotope. To compute their polar sine, first normalize each vector so that its length is 1, giving vectors $\hat\mathbf{v}_1, \ldots, \hat\mathbf{v}_n$. Then the polar sine is the determinant

$$\operatorname{psin}(\mathbf{v}_1,\dots,\mathbf{v}_n) =
\det\begin{bmatrix}\hat\mathbf{v}_1 & \hat\mathbf{v}_2 & \cdots & \hat\mathbf{v}_n \end{bmatrix} =
\begin{vmatrix}
\hat v_{11} & \hat v_{21} & \cdots & \hat v_{n1} \\
\hat v_{12} & \hat v_{22} & \cdots & \hat v_{n2} \\
\vdots & \vdots & \ddots & \vdots \\
\hat v_{1n} & \hat v_{2n} & \cdots & \hat v_{nn} \\
\end{vmatrix}\,.$$

=== In higher dimensions ===
A non-negative version of the polar sine that works in any m-dimensional space can be defined using the Gram determinant. It is a ratio where the denominator is as described in Definition 1 above. The numerator is

$$|\Omega|  = \sqrt{\det \left(\begin{bmatrix}\mathbf{v}_1 & \mathbf{v}_2 & \cdots & \mathbf{v}_n \end{bmatrix}^T
\begin{bmatrix}\mathbf{v}_1 & \mathbf{v}_2 & \cdots & \mathbf{v}_n \end{bmatrix} \right)} \,,$$

where the superscript T indicates matrix transposition. This can be nonzero only if m ≥ n. In the case m = n, this is equivalent to the absolute value of the definition given previously. In the degenerate case m < n, the determinant will be of a singular n × n matrix, giving Ω = 0 and psin = 0, because it is not possible to have n linearly independent vectors in m-dimensional space when m < n.

Equivalently, one can normalize the vectors before computing the determinant and its square root. With this approach the denominator equals 1 and can be ignored.

== Properties ==
=== Interchange of vectors ===
The polar sine changes sign whenever two vectors are interchanged, due to the antisymmetry of row-exchanging in the determinant; however, its absolute value will remain unchanged.

$$\begin{align}
\Omega & = \det\begin{bmatrix}\mathbf{v}_1 & \mathbf{v}_2 & \cdots & \mathbf{v}_i & \cdots & \mathbf{v}_j & \cdots & \mathbf{v}_n \end{bmatrix} \\
& = -\!\det\begin{bmatrix}\mathbf{v}_1 & \mathbf{v}_2 & \cdots & \mathbf{v}_j & \cdots & \mathbf{v}_i & \cdots & \mathbf{v}_n \end{bmatrix} \\
& = -\Omega
\end{align}$$

=== Invariance under scalar multiplication of vectors ===
The polar sine does not change if all of the vectors v_{1}, ..., v_{n} are scalar-multiplied by positive constants c_{i}, due to factorization

$$\begin{align}
\operatorname{psin}(c_1 \mathbf{v}_1,\dots, c_n \mathbf{v}_n) & = \frac{\det\begin{bmatrix}c_1\mathbf{v}_1 & c_2\mathbf{v}_2 & \cdots & c_n\mathbf{v}_n \end{bmatrix}}{\prod_{i=1}^n \|c_i \mathbf{v}_i\|} \\[6pt]
& = \frac{\prod_{i=1}^n c_i}{\prod_{i=1}^n |c_i|} \cdot \frac{\det\begin{bmatrix} \mathbf{v}_1 & \mathbf{v}_2 & \cdots & \mathbf{v}_n \end{bmatrix}}{\prod_{i=1}^n \|\mathbf{v}_i\|} \\[6pt]
& = \operatorname{psin}(\mathbf{v}_1,\dots, \mathbf{v}_n).
\end{align}$$

If an odd number of these constants are instead negative, then the sign of the polar sine will change; however, its absolute value will remain unchanged.

=== Vanishes with linear dependencies ===
If the vectors are not linearly independent, the polar sine will be zero. This will always be so in the degenerate case that the number of dimensions m is strictly less than the number of vectors n.

=== Relationship to pairwise cosines ===
The cosine of the angle between two non-zero vectors is given by

$$\cos(\mathbf{v}_1, \mathbf{v}_2) = \frac{\mathbf{v}_1 \cdot \mathbf{v}_2}{\|\mathbf{v}_1\| \|\mathbf{v}_2\|}\,$$

using the dot product. Comparison of this expression to the definition of the absolute value of the polar sine as given above gives:

$$\left|\operatorname{psin}(\mathbf{v}_1, \ldots, \mathbf{v}_n)\right|^2
= \det\!\left[\begin{matrix}
1 & \cos(\mathbf{v}_1, \mathbf{v}_2) & \cdots & \cos(\mathbf{v}_1, \mathbf{v}_n) \\
\cos(\mathbf{v}_2, \mathbf{v}_1) & 1 & \cdots & \cos(\mathbf{v}_2, \mathbf{v}_n) \\
\vdots & \vdots & \ddots & \vdots \\
\cos(\mathbf{v}_n, \mathbf{v}_1) & \cos(\mathbf{v}_n, \mathbf{v}_2) & \cdots & 1 \\
\end{matrix}\right].$$

In particular, for n = 2, this is equivalent to

$$\sin^2(\mathbf{v}_1, \mathbf{v}_2) = 1 - \cos^2(\mathbf{v}_1, \mathbf{v}_2)\,,$$

which is the Pythagorean theorem.

== History ==
Polar sines were investigated by Euler in the 18th century.

== See also ==
- Trigonometric functions
- List of trigonometric identities
- Solid angle
- Simplex
- Law of sines
- Cross product and Seven-dimensional cross product
- Graded algebra
- Exterior derivative
- Differential geometry
- Volume integral
- Measure (mathematics)
- Product integral
