= Vector calculus =

Calculus of vector-valued functions

Vector calculus or vector analysis is a branch of mathematics concerned with the differentiation and integration of vector fields, primarily in three-dimensional Euclidean space, $\mathbb{R}^3.$ The term "vector calculus" is sometimes used as a synonym for the broader subject of multivariable calculus, which spans vector calculus as well as partial differentiation and multiple integration. Vector calculus plays an important role in differential geometry and in the study of partial differential equations. It is used extensively in physics and engineering, especially in the description of electromagnetic fields, gravitational fields, and fluid flow.

Vector calculus was developed from the theory of quaternions by J. Willard Gibbs and Oliver Heaviside near the end of the 19th century, and most of the notation and terminology was established by Gibbs and Edwin Bidwell Wilson in their 1901 book, Vector Analysis, though earlier mathematicians such as Isaac Newton pioneered the field. In its standard form using the cross product, vector calculus does not generalize to higher dimensions, but the alternative approach of geometric algebra, which uses the exterior product, does (see § Generalizations below for more).

== Basic objects ==
=== Scalar fields ===
A scalar field smoothly assigns a scalar value to every point in a space. The scalar is a mathematical number representing a physical quantity. Examples of scalar fields in applications include the temperature distribution throughout space, the pressure distribution in a fluid, and spin-zero quantum fields (known as scalar bosons), such as the Higgs field. These fields are the subject of scalar field theory.

=== Vector fields ===
A vector field is a smooth assignment of a vector to each point in a space. A vector field in the plane, for instance, can be visualized as a collection of arrows with a given magnitude and direction each attached to a point in the plane. Vector fields are often used to model, for example, the speed and direction of a moving fluid throughout space, or the strength and direction of some force, such as the magnetic or gravitational force, as it changes from point to point. This can be used, for example, to calculate work done over a line.

=== Vectors and pseudovectors ===
In more advanced treatments, one further distinguishes pseudovector fields and pseudoscalar fields, which are identical to vector fields and scalar fields, except that they change sign under an orientation-reversing map: for example, the curl of a vector field is a pseudovector field, and if one reflects a vector field, the curl points in the opposite direction. This distinction is clarified and elaborated in geometric algebra, as described below.

== Vector algebra ==
The algebraic (non-differential) operations in vector calculus are referred to as vector algebra, being defined for a vector space and then applied pointwise to a vector field. The basic algebraic operations consist of:

Notations in vector calculus
Operation	Notation	Description
Vector addition	$\mathbf{v}_1 + \mathbf{v}_2$	Addition of two vectors, yielding a vector.
Scalar multiplication	$a \mathbf{v}$	Multiplication of a scalar and a vector, yielding a vector.
Dot product	$\mathbf{v}_1 \cdot \mathbf{v}_2$	Multiplication of two vectors, yielding a scalar.
Cross product	$\mathbf{v}_1 \times \mathbf{v}_2$	Multiplication of two vectors in $\mathbb R^3$, yielding a (pseudo)vector.

Also commonly used are the two triple products:

Vector calculus triple products
Operation	Notation	Description
Scalar triple product	$\mathbf{v}_1\cdot\left( \mathbf{v}_2\times\mathbf{v}_3 \right)$	The dot product of the cross product of two vectors.
Vector triple product	$\mathbf{v}_1\times\left( \mathbf{v}_2\times\mathbf{v}_3 \right)$	The cross product of the cross product of two vectors.

== Operators and theorems ==
=== Differential operators ===
Vector calculus studies various differential operators defined on scalar or vector fields, which are typically expressed in terms of the del operator ($\nabla$), also known as "nabla". The three basic vector operators are:

Differential operators in vector calculus
Operation	Notation	Description	Notational analogy	Domain/Range
Gradient	$\operatorname{grad}(f)=\nabla f$	Measures the rate and direction of change in a scalar field.	Scalar multiplication	Maps scalar fields to vector fields.
Divergence	$\operatorname{div}(\mathbf{F})=\nabla\cdot\mathbf{F}$	Measures the scalar of a source or sink at a given point in a vector field.	Dot product	Maps vector fields to scalar fields.
Curl	$\operatorname{curl}(\mathbf{F})=\nabla\times\mathbf{F}$	Measures the tendency to rotate about a point in a vector field in $\mathbb R^3$.	Cross product	Maps vector fields to (pseudo)vector fields.
f denotes a scalar field and F denotes a vector field

Also commonly used are the two Laplace operators:

Laplace operators in vector calculus
Operation	Notation	Description	Domain/Range
Laplacian	$\Delta f=\nabla^2 f=\nabla\cdot \nabla f$	Measures the difference between the value of the scalar field with its average on infinitesimal balls.	Maps between scalar fields.
Vector Laplacian	$\nabla^2\mathbf{F}=\nabla(\nabla\cdot\mathbf{F})-\nabla \times (\nabla \times \mathbf{F})$	Measures the difference between the value of the vector field with its average on infinitesimal balls.	Maps between vector fields.
f denotes a scalar field and F denotes a vector field

A quantity called the Jacobian matrix is useful for studying functions when both the domain and range of the function are multivariable, such as a change of variables during integration.

=== Integral theorems ===
The three basic vector operators have corresponding theorems which generalize the fundamental theorem of calculus to higher dimensions:

Integral theorems of vector calculus
Theorem	Statement	Description
Gradient theorem	$\int_{L \subset \mathbb R^n}\!\!\! \nabla\varphi\cdot d\mathbf{r} \ =\ \varphi\left(\mathbf{q}\right)-\varphi\left(\mathbf{p}\right)\ \ \text{ for }\ \ L = L[p\to q]$	The line integral of the gradient of a scalar field over a curve L is equal to the change in the scalar field between the endpoints p and q of the curve.
Divergence theorem	$\underbrace{ \int \!\cdots\! \int_{V \subset \mathbb R^n} }_n (\nabla \cdot \mathbf{F}) \, dV \ = \ \underbrace{ \oint \!\cdots\! \oint_{\partial V} }_{n-1} \mathbf{F} \cdot d \mathbf{S}$	The integral of the divergence of a vector field over an n-dimensional solid V is equal to the flux of the vector field through the (n−1)-dimensional closed boundary surface of the solid.
Curl (Kelvin–Stokes) theorem	$\iint_{\Sigma\subset\mathbb R^3} (\nabla \times \mathbf{F}) \cdot d\mathbf{\Sigma} \ =\ \oint_{\partial \Sigma} \mathbf{F} \cdot d \mathbf{r}$	The integral of the curl of a vector field over a surface Σ in $\mathbb R^3$ is equal to the circulation of the vector field around the closed curve bounding the surface.
$\varphi$ denotes a scalar field and F denotes a vector field

In two dimensions, the divergence and curl theorems reduce to the Green's theorem:

Green's theorem of vector calculus
Theorem	Statement	Description
Green's theorem	$\iint_{A\,\subset\mathbb R^2} \left(\frac{\partial M}{\partial x} - \frac{\partial L}{\partial y}\right) dA \ =\ \oint_{\partial A} \left ( L\, dx + M\, dy \right )$	The integral of the divergence (or curl) of a vector field over some region A in $\mathbb R^2$ equals the flux (or circulation) of the vector field over the closed curve bounding the region.
For divergence, F = (M, −L). For curl, F = (L, M, 0). L and M are functions of (x, y).

== Applications ==
=== Linear approximations ===
Linear approximations are used to replace complicated functions with linear functions that are almost the same. Given a differentiable function f(x, y) with real values, one can approximate f(x, y) for (x, y) close to (a, b) by the formula
$$f(x,y)\ \approx\ f(a,b)+\tfrac{\partial f}{\partial x} (a,b)\,(x-a)+\tfrac{\partial f}{\partial y}(a,b)\,(y-b).$$

The right-hand side is the equation of the plane tangent to the graph of z = f(x, y) at (a, b).

=== Optimization ===
For a continuously differentiable function of several real variables, a point P (that is, a set of values for the input variables, which is viewed as a point in R^{n}) is critical if all of the partial derivatives of the function are zero at P, or, equivalently, if its gradient is zero. The critical values are the values of the function at the critical points.

If the function is smooth, or, at least twice continuously differentiable, a critical point may be either a local maximum, a local minimum or a saddle point. The different cases may be distinguished by considering the eigenvalues of the Hessian matrix of second derivatives.

By Fermat's theorem, all local maxima and minima of a differentiable function occur at critical points. Therefore, to find the local maxima and minima, it suffices, theoretically, to compute the zeros of the gradient and the eigenvalues of the Hessian matrix at these zeros.

== Generalizations ==
Vector calculus can also be generalized to other 3-manifolds and higher-dimensional spaces.

=== Different 3-manifolds ===
Vector calculus is initially defined for Euclidean 3-space, $\mathbb{R}^3,$ which has additional structure beyond simply being a 3-dimensional real vector space, namely: a norm (giving a notion of length) defined via an inner product (the dot product), which in turn gives a notion of angle, and an orientation, which gives a notion of left-handed and right-handed. These structures give rise to a volume form, and also the cross product, which is used pervasively in vector calculus.

The gradient and divergence require only the inner product, while the curl and the cross product also requires the handedness of the coordinate system to be taken into account.

Vector calculus can be defined on other 3-dimensional real vector spaces if they have an inner product (or more generally a symmetric nondegenerate form) and an orientation; this is less data than an isomorphism to Euclidean space, as it does not require a set of coordinates (a frame of reference), which reflects the fact that vector calculus is invariant under rotations (the special orthogonal group SO(3)).

More generally, vector calculus can be defined on any 3-dimensional oriented Riemannian manifold, or more generally pseudo-Riemannian manifold. This structure simply means that the tangent space at each point has an inner product (more generally, a symmetric nondegenerate form) and an orientation, or more globally that there is a symmetric nondegenerate metric tensor and an orientation, and works because vector calculus is defined in terms of tangent vectors at each point.

=== Other dimensions ===
Most of the analytic results are easily understood, in a more general form, using the machinery of differential geometry, of which vector calculus forms a subset. Grad and div generalize immediately to other dimensions, as do the gradient theorem, divergence theorem, and Laplacian (yielding harmonic analysis), while curl and cross product do not generalize as directly.

From a general point of view, the various fields in (3-dimensional) vector calculus are uniformly seen as being k-vector fields: scalar fields are 0-vector fields, vector fields are 1-vector fields, pseudovector fields are 2-vector fields, and pseudoscalar fields are 3-vector fields. In higher dimensions there are additional types of fields (scalar, vector, pseudovector or pseudoscalar corresponding to 0, 1, n − 1 or n dimensions, which is exhaustive in dimension 3), so one cannot only work with (pseudo)scalars and (pseudo)vectors.

In any dimension, assuming a nondegenerate form, grad of a scalar function is a vector field, and div of a vector field is a scalar function, but only in dimension 3 or 7 (and, trivially, in dimension 0 or 1) is the curl of a vector field a vector field, and only in 3 or 7 dimensions can a cross product be defined (generalizations in other dimensionalities either require $n-1$ vectors to yield 1 vector, or are alternative Lie algebras, which are more general antisymmetric bilinear products). The generalization of grad and div, and how curl may be generalized is elaborated at Curl § Generalizations; in brief, the curl of a vector field is a bivector field, which may be interpreted as the special orthogonal Lie algebra of infinitesimal rotations; however, this cannot be identified with a vector field because the dimensions differ – there are 3 dimensions of rotations in 3 dimensions, but 6 dimensions of rotations in 4 dimensions (and more generally $\textstyle{\binom{n}{2}=\frac{1}{2}n(n-1)}$ dimensions of rotations in n dimensions).

There are two important alternative generalizations of vector calculus. The first, geometric algebra, uses k-vector fields instead of vector fields (in 3 or fewer dimensions, every k-vector field can be identified with a scalar function or vector field, but this is not true in higher dimensions). This replaces the cross product, which is specific to 3 dimensions, taking in two vector fields and giving as output a vector field, with the exterior product, which exists in all dimensions and takes in two vector fields, giving as output a bivector (2-vector) field. This product yields Clifford algebras as the algebraic structure on vector spaces (with an orientation and nondegenerate form). Geometric algebra is mostly used in generalizations of physics and other applied fields to higher dimensions.

The second generalization uses differential forms (k-covector fields) instead of vector fields or k-vector fields, and is widely used in mathematics, particularly in differential geometry, geometric topology, and harmonic analysis, in particular yielding Hodge theory on oriented pseudo-Riemannian manifolds. From this point of view, grad, curl, and div correspond to the exterior derivative of 0-forms, 1-forms, and 2-forms, respectively, and the key theorems of vector calculus are all special cases of the general form of Stokes' theorem.

From the point of view of both of these generalizations, vector calculus implicitly identifies mathematically distinct objects, which makes the presentation simpler but the underlying mathematical structure and generalizations less clear. From the point of view of geometric algebra, vector calculus implicitly identifies k-vector fields with vector fields or scalar functions: 0-vectors and 3-vectors with scalars, 1-vectors and 2-vectors with vectors. From the point of view of differential forms, vector calculus implicitly identifies k-forms with scalar fields or vector fields: 0-forms and 3-forms with scalar fields, 1-forms and 2-forms with vector fields. Thus for example the curl naturally takes as input a vector field or 1-form, but naturally has as output a 2-vector field or 2-form (hence pseudovector field), which is then interpreted as a vector field, rather than directly taking a vector field to a vector field; this is reflected in the curl of a vector field in higher dimensions not having as output a vector field.

=== Tensor fields ===
The scalar and vector fields above are specific cases of tensor fields. In differential geometry, a vector field is defined as a map from a manifold $M$ to its tangent bundle, defined as the disjoint union of all tangent spaces (one tangent space for each point) of $M$,

$$V: M \to TM,\ TM \equiv \bigsqcup_{p \in M}T_pM$$

Similarly, a covector field is a map from a manifold to its cotangent bundle (defined analogously to the above expression but replacing $T_pM$ with $T^*_pM$). A $(p, q)$ tensor can be formed by taking a tensor product of a $(p, 0)$ tensor and a $(0, q)$ tensor, which themselves can be formed by taking $p$- and $q$-fold tensor products of vectors and covectors, respectively. Thus a $(p, q)$ tensor field is a map from a manifold to bundles of $p$- and $q$-fold tensor products of the tangent spaces and cotangent spaces (to which vectors and covectors belong, respectively).

$$T: M \to \bigsqcup_{x \in M}\bigotimes_{j = 1}^p T_pM\bigotimes_{i = 1}^q T^*_pM$$

With this generalization we see that the scalar and vector fields defined above are just $(0, 0)$ and $(1, 0)$ tensor fields.

== See also ==
- Conservative vector field
- Directional derivative
- Geometric calculus
- Helmholtz decomposition
- Laplacian vector field
- Solenoidal vector field
- Tensor
- Vector algebra relations
- Vector calculus identities
