= Vector multiplication =

In mathematics, vector multiplication may refer to one of several operations between two (or more) vectors. It may concern any of the following articles:

- Dot product – also known as the "scalar product", a binary operation that takes two vectors and returns a scalar quantity. The dot product of two vectors can be defined as the product of the magnitudes of the two vectors and the cosine of the angle between the two vectors. Alternatively, it is defined as the product of the projection of the first vector onto the second vector and the magnitude of the second vector. Thus,
  $$\mathbf{a} \cdot \mathbf{b} = |\mathbf{a}| \, |\mathbf{b}| \cos \theta$$
- Cross product – also known as the "vector product", a binary operation on two vectors that results in another vector. The cross product of two vectors in 3-space is defined as the vector perpendicular to the plane determined by the two vectors whose magnitude is the product of the magnitudes of the two vectors and the sine of the angle between the two vectors. So, if $\mathbf{\hat{n}}$ is the unit vector perpendicular to the plane determined by vectors $\mathbf{a}$ and $\mathbf{b}$,
  $$\mathbf{a} \times \mathbf{b} = |\mathbf{a}| \, |\mathbf{b}| \sin \theta \, \mathbf{\hat{n}}.$$
- Exterior product or wedge product – a binary operation on two vectors that results in a bivector. In Euclidean 3-space, the wedge product $\mathbf{a} \wedge \mathbf{b}$ has the same magnitude as the cross product $\mathbf{a} \times \mathbf{b}$ (the area of the parallelogram formed by sides $\mathbf{a}$ and $\mathbf{b}$) but generalizes to arbitrary affine spaces and products between more than two vectors.
- Tensor product – for two vectors $v\in V$ and $w\in W,$ where $V$ and $W$ are vector spaces, their tensor product $v\otimes w$ belongs to the tensor product $V\otimes W$ of the vector spaces.
- Geometric product or Clifford product – for two vectors, the geometric product
  $$\mathbf{a} \mathbf{b} = \mathbf{a} \cdot \mathbf{b} + \mathbf{a} \wedge \mathbf{b}$$
  is a mixed quantity consisting of a scalar plus a bivector. The geometric product is well defined for any multivectors as arguments.
- A bilinear product in an algebra over a field.
- A Lie bracket for vectors in a Lie algebra.
- Hadamard product – entrywise or elementwise product of tuples of scalar coordinates, where $(a \odot b)_i = a_i b_i$.
- Outer product - where $(\mathbf{a} \otimes \mathbf{b})$ with $\mathbf{a} \in \mathbb{R}^m, \mathbf{b} \in \mathbb{R}^n$ results in a $(m \times n)$ matrix.
- Triple products – products involving three vectors.
- Quadruple products – products involving four vectors.

== Applications ==
Vector multiplication has multiple applications in regards to mathematics, but also in other studies such as physics and engineering.

=== Physics ===
- The cross product occurs frequently in the study of rotation, where it is used to calculate torque and angular momentum. It can also be used to calculate the Lorentz force exerted on a charged particle moving in a magnetic field.
- The dot product is used to determine the work done by a constant force.

== See also ==
- Scalar multiplication
- Matrix multiplication
- Vector addition
- Vector algebra relations
