= Formal operation =

The term formal operation may refer to:

- the formal operational period in Piaget's theory of cognitive development.
- a formal calculation in mathematical logic.
