= Pierre Frédéric Sarrus =

French mathematician (1798–1861)

- Born: 10 March 1798; Saint-Affrique, France
- Died: 20 November 1861 (aged 63)
- Occupation: Mathematician

Pierre Frédéric Sarrus (French pronunciation: [pjɛʁ fʁedeʁik saʁy]; 10 March 1798, Saint-Affrique – 20 November 1861) was a French mathematician.

Sarrus was a professor at the University of Strasbourg, France (1826–1856) and a member of the French Academy of Sciences in Paris (1842). He is the author of several treatises, including one on the solution of numeric equations with multiple unknowns (1842); one on multiple integrals and their integrability conditions; and one on the determination of the orbits of the comets.

Sarrus discovered a mnemonic rule for solving the determinant of a 3-by-3 matrix, named rule of Sarrus. He also demonstrated the fundamental lemma of the calculus of variations. Additionally, he developed the Sarrus linkage, the first linkage capable of transforming rotary motion into perfect straight-line motion, and vice versa. Sarrus numbers (Fermat pseudoprimes to base 2) are also named after Sarrus, who discovered the first number (341).
