= Lagrange's formula =

Lagrange's formula may refer to a number of results named after Joseph Louis Lagrange:

- Lagrange interpolation formula
- Lagrange–Bürmann formula
- Triple product expansion
- Mean value theorem
- Euler–Lagrange equation
