= Rule of Sarrus =

Mnemonic device for calculating 3 by 3 matrix determinants

Rule of Sarrus: The determinant of the three columns on the left is the sum of the products along the down-right diagonals minus the sum of the products along the up-right diagonals.

In matrix theory, the rule of Sarrus, named after the French mathematician Pierre Frédéric Sarrus, is a mnemonic device for computing the determinant of a $3 \times 3$ matrix.

Consider a $3 \times 3$ matrix

$$M=\begin{bmatrix}a&b&c\\d&e&f\\g&h&i\end{bmatrix}.$$

Its determinant can be computed by the following scheme.

Write out the first two columns of the matrix to the right of the third column, giving five columns in a row. Then add the products of the diagonals going from top to bottom (solid) and subtract the products of the diagonals going from bottom to top (dashed). This yields

$$\begin{align}
\det(M)= \begin{vmatrix}
a&b&c\\d&e&f\\g&h&i
\end{vmatrix}=
aei + bfg + cdh - gec - hfa - idb .
\end{align}$$

Alternative vertical arrangement

A similar scheme based on diagonals works for $2 \times 2$ matrices:

$$\begin{vmatrix}
a&b\\c&d
\end{vmatrix}
=ad - bc$$

Both are special cases of the Leibniz formula, which, however, does not yield similar memorization schemes for larger matrices. The determinants of $4 \times 4$ matrices can be found by expanding the most convenient row or column by cofactors and then applying the rule to each of the resulting determinants (especially if there are elements in the matrix that are zero). For matrices beyond $4 \times 4$ this becomes impractical except for specific cases where there are many zero elements.

Sarrus's rule can also be derived using the Laplace expansion of a $3 \times 3$ matrix.

Another way of thinking of Sarrus's rule is to imagine that the matrix is wrapped around a cylinder, such that the right and left edges are joined.
