= Triple product =

Ternary operation on vectors

In geometry and algebra, the triple product is a product of three 3-dimensional vectors, usually Euclidean vectors. The name "triple product" is used for two different products, the scalar-valued scalar triple product and, less often, the vector-valued vector triple product.

== Scalar triple product ==
Three vectors defining a parallelepiped

The scalar triple product (also called the mixed product, box product, or triple scalar product) is defined as the dot product of one of the vectors with the cross product of the other two.

=== Geometric interpretation ===
Geometrically, the scalar triple product

$$\mathbf{a}\cdot(\mathbf{b}\times \mathbf{c})$$

is the (signed) volume of the parallelepiped defined by the three vectors given.

=== Properties ===
- The scalar triple product is unchanged under a circular shift of its three operands (a, b, c):
  $$\mathbf{a}\cdot(\mathbf{b}\times \mathbf{c})=
\mathbf{b}\cdot(\mathbf{c}\times \mathbf{a})=
\mathbf{c}\cdot(\mathbf{a}\times \mathbf{b})$$
- Swapping the positions of the operators without re-ordering the operands leaves the triple product unchanged. This follows from the preceding property and the commutative property of the dot product:
  $$\mathbf{a}\cdot (\mathbf{b}\times \mathbf{c}) =
(\mathbf{a}\times \mathbf{b})\cdot \mathbf{c}$$
- Swapping any two of the three operands negates the triple product. This follows from the circular-shift property and the anticommutativity of the cross product:
  $$\begin{align}
\mathbf{a}\cdot(\mathbf{b}\times \mathbf{c})
&= -\mathbf{a}\cdot(\mathbf{c}\times \mathbf{b}) \\
&= -\mathbf{b}\cdot(\mathbf{a}\times \mathbf{c}) \\
&= -\mathbf{c}\cdot(\mathbf{b}\times \mathbf{a})
\end{align}$$
- The scalar triple product can also be understood as the determinant of the 3×3 matrix that has the three vectors either as its rows or its columns (a matrix has the same determinant as its transpose):
  $$\mathbf{a}\cdot(\mathbf{b}\times \mathbf{c})
= \det \begin{bmatrix}
a_1 & a_2 & a_3 \\
b_1 & b_2 & b_3 \\
c_1 & c_2 & c_3 \\
\end{bmatrix}
= \det \begin{bmatrix} a_1 & b_1 & c_1 \\ a_2 & b_2 & c_2 \\ a_3 & b_3 & c_3 \end{bmatrix}
= \det \begin{bmatrix} \mathbf{a} & \mathbf{b} & \mathbf{c} \end{bmatrix} .$$
- If the scalar triple product is equal to zero, then the three vectors a, b, and c are coplanar, since the parallelepiped defined by them would be flat and have no volume.
- If any two vectors in the scalar triple product are equal, then its value is zero:
  $$\mathbf{a} \cdot (\mathbf{a} \times \mathbf{b}) =
\mathbf{a} \cdot (\mathbf{b} \times \mathbf{a}) =
\mathbf{b} \cdot (\mathbf{a} \times \mathbf{a}) = 0$$
- Also:
  $$(\mathbf{a}\cdot(\mathbf{b}\times \mathbf{c}))\, \mathbf{a} =
(\mathbf{a}\times \mathbf{b})\times (\mathbf{a}\times \mathbf{c})$$
- The simple product of two triple products (or the square of a triple product), may be expanded in terms of dot products:
  $$((\mathbf{a}\times \mathbf{b}) \cdot \mathbf{c})\;((\mathbf{d} \times \mathbf{e}) \cdot \mathbf{f})
= \det \begin{bmatrix}
\mathbf{a}\cdot \mathbf{d} & \mathbf{a}\cdot \mathbf{e} & \mathbf{a}\cdot \mathbf{f} \\
\mathbf{b}\cdot \mathbf{d} & \mathbf{b}\cdot \mathbf{e} & \mathbf{b}\cdot \mathbf{f} \\
\mathbf{c}\cdot \mathbf{d} & \mathbf{c}\cdot \mathbf{e} & \mathbf{c}\cdot \mathbf{f}
\end{bmatrix}$$
  This restates in vector notation that the product of the determinants of two 3 × 3 matrices equals the determinant of their matrix product. As a special case, the square of a triple product is a Gram determinant. Note that this determinant is well defined for vectors in R^{m} (m-dimensional Euclidean space) even when m ≠ 3; in particular, the absolute value of a triple product for three vectors in R^{m} can be computed from this formula for the square of a triple product by taking its square root:
  $$|(\mathbf{a}\times \mathbf{b}) \cdot \mathbf{c}|
= \sqrt{\det \begin{bmatrix}
\mathbf{a}\cdot \mathbf{a} & \mathbf{a}\cdot \mathbf{b} & \mathbf{a}\cdot \mathbf{c} \\
\mathbf{b}\cdot \mathbf{a} & \mathbf{b}\cdot \mathbf{b} & \mathbf{b}\cdot \mathbf{c} \\
\mathbf{c}\cdot \mathbf{a} & \mathbf{c}\cdot \mathbf{b} & \mathbf{c}\cdot \mathbf{c}
\end{bmatrix}}$$
- The ratio of the triple product and the product of the three vector norms is known as a polar sine:
  $$\frac{\mathbf{a}\cdot(\mathbf{b}\times \mathbf{c})}{\left\|{\mathbf{a}}\right\| \left\|{\mathbf{b}}\right\| \left\|{\mathbf{c}}\right\|} = \operatorname{psin}(\mathbf{a},\mathbf{b},\mathbf{c})$$
  which ranges between −1 and 1.

=== The triple product is a scalar density ===
Strictly speaking, a scalar does not change at all under a coordinate transformation. (For example, the factor of 2 used for doubling a vector does not change if the vector is in spherical vs. rectangular coordinates.) However, if each vector is transformed by a matrix then the triple product ends up being multiplied by the determinant of the transformation matrix. That is, the triple product of covariant vectors is more properly described as a scalar density.

$$\begin{align}
T\mathbf{a} \cdot (T\mathbf{b} \times T\mathbf{c})
& = \det\begin{pmatrix} T\mathbf{a} & T\mathbf{b} & T\mathbf{c} \end{pmatrix} \\
& = \det\left(T \begin{pmatrix} \mathbf{a} & \mathbf{b} & \mathbf{c} \end{pmatrix} \right) \\
& = \det(T) \det\!\begin{pmatrix} \mathbf{a} & \mathbf{b} & \mathbf{c} \end{pmatrix} \\
& = \det(T) \left(\mathbf{a} \cdot (\mathbf{b} \times \mathbf{c})\right)
\end{align}$$

Some authors use "pseudoscalar" to describe an object that looks like a scalar but does not transform like one. Because the triple product transforms as a scalar density not as a scalar, it could be called a "pseudoscalar" by this broader definition. However, the triple product is not a "pseudoscalar density".

When a transformation is an orientation-preserving rotation, its determinant is +1 and the triple product is unchanged. When a transformation is an orientation-reversing rotation then its determinant is −1 and the triple product is negated. An arbitrary transformation could have a determinant that is neither +1 nor −1.

=== As an exterior product ===
The three vectors spanning a parallelepiped have triple product equal to its volume. (However, beware that the direction of the arrows in this diagram is incorrect.)

In exterior algebra and geometric algebra the exterior product of two vectors is a bivector, while the exterior product of three vectors is a trivector. A bivector is an oriented plane element and a trivector is an oriented volume element, in the same way that a vector is an oriented line element.

Given vectors a, b and c, the product

$$\mathbf{a} \wedge \mathbf{b} \wedge \mathbf{c}$$

is a trivector with magnitude equal to the scalar triple product, i.e.

$$|\mathbf{a} \wedge \mathbf{b} \wedge \mathbf{c}| = |\mathbf{a}\cdot(\mathbf{b} \times\mathbf{c})|$$,

and is the Hodge dual of the scalar triple product. As the exterior product is associative brackets are not needed as it does not matter which of a ∧ b or b ∧ c is calculated first, though the order of the vectors in the product does matter. Geometrically the trivector a ∧ b ∧ c corresponds to the parallelepiped spanned by a, b, and c, with bivectors a ∧ b, b ∧ c and a ∧ c matching the parallelogram faces of the parallelepiped.

=== As a trilinear function ===
The triple product is identical to the volume form of the Euclidean 3-space applied to the vectors via interior product. It also can be expressed as a contraction of vectors with a rank-3 tensor equivalent to the form (or a pseudotensor equivalent to the volume pseudoform); see below.

== Vector triple product ==
The vector triple product is defined as the cross product of one vector with the cross product of the other two. The following relationship holds:

$$\mathbf{a}\times (\mathbf{b}\times \mathbf{c}) = (\mathbf{a}\cdot\mathbf{c})\mathbf{b} -(\mathbf{a}\cdot\mathbf{b}) \mathbf{c}$$.

This is known as triple product expansion, or Lagrange's formula, although the latter name is also used for several other formulas. A proof is provided below.

Since the cross product is anticommutative, this formula may also be written (up to permutation of the letters) as:

$$(\mathbf{a}\times \mathbf{b})\times \mathbf{c} = -\mathbf{c}\times(\mathbf{a}\times \mathbf{b}) = -(\mathbf{c}\cdot\mathbf{b})\mathbf{a} + (\mathbf{c}\cdot\mathbf{a})\mathbf{b}$$

From Lagrange's formula it follows that the vector triple product satisfies:

$$\mathbf{a}\times (\mathbf{b}\times \mathbf{c}) + \mathbf{b}\times (\mathbf{c}\times \mathbf{a}) + \mathbf{c} \times (\mathbf{a}\times \mathbf{b}) =  \mathbf{0}$$

which is the Jacobi identity for the cross product. Another useful formula follows:

$$(\mathbf{a}\times \mathbf{b}) \times \mathbf{c} = \mathbf{a}\times (\mathbf{b}\times \mathbf{c}) - \mathbf{b} \times (\mathbf{a} \times \mathbf{c})$$

These formulas are very useful in simplifying vector calculations in physics. A related identity regarding gradients and useful in vector calculus is Lagrange's formula of vector cross-product identity:

$$\boldsymbol{\nabla} \times (\boldsymbol{\nabla} \times \mathbf{A}) = \boldsymbol{\nabla} (\boldsymbol{\nabla} \cdot  \mathbf{A}) - (\boldsymbol{\nabla} \cdot \boldsymbol{\nabla}) \mathbf{A}$$

This can be also regarded as a special case of the more general Laplace–de Rham operator $\Delta = d \delta + \delta d$.

=== Proof ===
The $x$ component of $\mathbf{u} \times (\mathbf{v}\times \mathbf{w})$ is given by:

$$\begin{align}
(\mathbf{u} \times (\mathbf{v} \times \mathbf{w}))_x
&= \mathbf{u}_y(\mathbf{v}_x\mathbf{w}_y - \mathbf{v}_y\mathbf{w}_x) - \mathbf{u}_z(\mathbf{v}_z\mathbf{w}_x - \mathbf{v}_x\mathbf{w}_z) \\
&= \mathbf{v}_x(\mathbf{u}_y\mathbf{w}_y + \mathbf{u}_z\mathbf{w}_z) - \mathbf{w}_x(\mathbf{u}_y\mathbf{v}_y + \mathbf{u}_z\mathbf{v}_z) \\
&= \mathbf{v}_x(\mathbf{u}_y\mathbf{w}_y + \mathbf{u}_z\mathbf{w}_z) - \mathbf{w}_x(\mathbf{u}_y\mathbf{v}_y + \mathbf{u}_z\mathbf{v}_z) + (\mathbf{u}_x\mathbf{v}_x\mathbf{w}_x - \mathbf{u}_x\mathbf{v}_x\mathbf{w}_x) \\
&= \mathbf{v}_x(\mathbf{u}_x\mathbf{w}_x + \mathbf{u}_y\mathbf{w}_y + \mathbf{u}_z\mathbf{w}_z) - \mathbf{w}_x(\mathbf{u}_x\mathbf{v}_x + \mathbf{u}_y\mathbf{v}_y + \mathbf{u}_z\mathbf{v}_z) \\
&= (\mathbf{u}\cdot\mathbf{w})\mathbf{v}_x - (\mathbf{u}\cdot\mathbf{v})\mathbf{w}_x
\end{align}$$

Similarly, the $y$ and $z$ components of $\mathbf{u}\times (\mathbf{v} \times \mathbf{w})$ are given by:

$$\begin{align}
(\mathbf{u} \times (\mathbf{v} \times \mathbf{w}))_y &= (\mathbf{u}\cdot\mathbf{w})\mathbf{v}_y - (\mathbf{u}\cdot\mathbf{v})\mathbf{w}_y \\
(\mathbf{u} \times (\mathbf{v} \times \mathbf{w}))_z &= (\mathbf{u}\cdot\mathbf{w})\mathbf{v}_z - (\mathbf{u}\cdot\mathbf{v})\mathbf{w}_z
\end{align}$$

By combining these three components we obtain:

$\mathbf{u}\times (\mathbf{v}\times \mathbf{w}) = (\mathbf{u}\cdot\mathbf{w})\ \mathbf{v} - (\mathbf{u}\cdot\mathbf{v})\ \mathbf{w}$

=== Using geometric algebra ===
If geometric algebra is used the cross product b × c of vectors is expressed as their exterior product b∧c, a bivector. The second cross product cannot be expressed as an exterior product, otherwise the scalar triple product would result. Instead a left contraction can be used, so the formula becomes

$$\begin{align}
-\mathbf{a} \;\big\lrcorner\; (\mathbf{b} \wedge \mathbf{c}) &=  \mathbf{b}  \wedge (\mathbf{a} \;\big\lrcorner\; \mathbf{c}) - (\mathbf{a} \;\big\lrcorner\; \mathbf{b}) \wedge \mathbf{c} \\
&=  (\mathbf{a} \cdot \mathbf{c}) \mathbf{b} - (\mathbf{a} \cdot \mathbf{b}) \mathbf{c}
\end{align}$$

The proof follows from the properties of the contraction. The result is the same vector as calculated using a × (b × c).

== Non-commutative triple vector product ==
With non-commutative vector operators $\mathbf{\hat{a}}, \mathbf{\hat{b}}, \mathbf{\hat{c}}$, special relations hold for the triple product in accordance to

$\mathbf{\hat{a}} \times \left( \mathbf{\hat{b}} \times \mathbf{\hat{c}} \right) = \mathbf{\hat{b}} \Big( \mathbf{\hat{a}} \cdot \mathbf{\hat{c}} \Big) - \mathbf{\hat{c}} \Big( \mathbf{\hat{a}} \cdot \mathbf{\hat{b}} \Big) + \sum_{\alpha,\beta=1}^3 \left( \left[\hat{a}_\beta,\hat{b}_\alpha\right] \hat{c}_\beta + \left[ \hat{c}_\alpha, \hat{a}_\beta \right] \hat{b}_\beta + \hat{a}_\beta \left[\hat{c}_\alpha , \hat{b}_\beta \right] \right) \mathbf{e}_\alpha$$\left( \mathbf{\hat{a}} \times \mathbf{\hat{b}} \right) \times \mathbf{\hat{c}} = \mathbf{\hat{b}} \left( \mathbf{\hat{a}} \cdot \mathbf{\hat{c}} \right) - \mathbf{\hat{a}} \left( \mathbf{\hat{b}} \cdot \mathbf{\hat{c}} \right) + \sum_{\alpha,\beta=1}^3 \left[\hat{a}_\beta,\hat{b}_\alpha\right] \hat{c}_\beta \mathbf{e}_\alpha$

with the unit vectors $\mathbf{e}_\alpha$of $\alpha$, with $\alpha$ and $\beta$ being indices of a three dimensional orthonormal basis and the square brackets repressenting the commutator.

=== Proof ===
Using the individual components of the cross product

$\left( \mathbf{a} \times \mathbf{b} \right)_\alpha = \varepsilon_{\alpha\beta\gamma} a_\beta b_\gamma \,,$

as well as the Levi-Civita symbol expression via the Kronecker Delta

$\varepsilon_{\alpha\beta\gamma} \varepsilon_{\gamma\mu\nu} = \delta_{\alpha\mu} \delta_{\beta\nu} - \delta_{\alpha\nu} \delta_{\beta\mu} \,,$

we receive the expression

$$\begin{align}
\left( \mathbf{\hat{a}} \times \left( \mathbf{\hat{b}} \times \mathbf{\hat{c}} \right) \right)_\alpha &= \varepsilon_{\alpha\beta\gamma} \hat{a}_\beta \left( \mathbf{\hat{b}} \times \mathbf{\hat{c}} \right)_\gamma = \varepsilon_{\alpha\beta\gamma} \hat{a}_\beta \varepsilon_{\gamma\mu\nu} \hat{b}_\mu \hat{c}_\nu\\
&= \left( \delta_{\alpha\mu} \delta_{\beta\nu} - \delta_{\alpha\nu} \delta_{\beta\mu} \right) \hat{a}_\beta \hat{b}_\mu \hat{c}_\nu = \hat{a}_\beta \hat{b}_\alpha \hat{c}_\beta - \hat{a}_\beta \hat{b}_\beta \hat{c}_\alpha \\
&= \left( \hat{b}_\alpha \hat{a}_\beta \hat{c}_\beta - \hat{c}_\alpha \hat{a}_\beta \hat{b}_\beta \right) + \left( \hat{a}_\beta \hat{b}_\alpha \hat{c}_\beta - \hat{b}_\alpha \hat{a}_\beta \hat{c}_\beta \right) + \left( \hat{c}_\alpha \hat{a}_\beta \hat{b}_\beta - \hat{a}_\beta \hat{b}_\beta \hat{c}_\alpha \right) \\
&= \hat{b}_\alpha \left( \hat{a}_\beta \hat{c}_\beta \right) - \hat{c}_\alpha \left( \hat{a}_\beta \hat{b}_\beta \right) + \left[\hat{a}_\beta,\hat{b}_\alpha\right] \hat{c}_\beta + \left[\hat{c}_\alpha,\hat{a}_\beta\hat{b}_\beta\right] \\
&= \hat{b}_\alpha \left( \mathbf{\hat{a}} \cdot \mathbf{\hat{c}} \right) - \hat{c}_\alpha \left( \mathbf{\hat{a}} \cdot \mathbf{\hat{b}} \right) + \left[\hat{a}_\beta,\hat{b}_\alpha\right] \hat{c}_\beta + \left[\hat{c}_\alpha,\hat{a}_\beta\right] \hat{b}_\beta + a_\beta \left[\hat{c}_\alpha,\hat{b}_\beta\right]
\end{align}$$

for the first identity and the expression

$$\begin{align}
\left( \left(\mathbf{\hat{a}} \times \mathbf{\hat{b}} \right) \times \mathbf{\hat{c}} \right)_\alpha &= \varepsilon_{\alpha\beta\gamma} \left( \mathbf{\hat{a}} \times \mathbf{\hat{b}} \right)_\beta \hat{c}_\gamma = \varepsilon_{\alpha\beta\gamma} \varepsilon_{\beta\mu\nu} \hat{a}_\mu \hat{b}_\nu \hat{c}_\gamma \\
&= \left( \delta_{\nu\alpha} \delta_{\mu\gamma} - \delta_{\mu\alpha} \delta_{\nu\gamma} \right) \hat{a}_\mu \hat{b}_\nu \hat{c}_\gamma = \hat{a}_\mu \hat{b}_\alpha \hat{c}_\mu - \hat{a}_\alpha \hat{b}_\nu \hat{c}_\nu \\
&= \left( \hat{a}_\mu \hat{b}_\alpha - \hat{b}_\alpha \hat{a}_\mu + \hat{b}_\alpha \hat{a}_\mu \right) \hat{c}_\mu - \hat{a}_\alpha \left( \mathbf{\hat{b}} \cdot \mathbf{\hat{c}} \right) \\
&= \left( \left[\hat{a}_\mu,\hat{b}_\alpha\right] + \hat{b}_\alpha \hat{a}_\mu \right) \hat{c}_\mu - \hat{a}_\alpha \left( \mathbf{\hat{b}} \cdot \mathbf{\hat{c}} \right) \\
&= \hat{b}_\alpha \left( \mathbf{\hat{a}} \cdot \mathbf{\hat{c}} \right) - \hat{a}_\alpha \left( \mathbf{\hat{b}} \cdot \mathbf{\hat{c}} \right) + \left[\hat{a}_\mu,\hat{b}_\alpha\right] \hat{c}_\mu
\end{align}$$

for the second identity for each of the three indices. By expressing them via a sum of all indices, the original identity is received.

== Triple bivector product ==
In geometric algebra, three bivectors can also have a triple product. This product mimics the standard triple vector product. The antisymmetric product of three bivectors is.

$$\overset\Rightarrow{a}\times \left(\overset\Rightarrow{b}\times\overset\Rightarrow{c}\right) = -\left(\overset\Rightarrow{a} \cdot \overset\Rightarrow{c}\right)\overset\Rightarrow{b} + \left(\overset\Rightarrow{a}\cdot \overset\Rightarrow{b}\right)\overset\Rightarrow{c}$$

=== Proof ===
This proof is made by taking dual of the geometric algebra version of the triple vector product until all vectors become bivectors.

$$\begin{alignat}{3}
& (-\mathbf{a} \;\big\lrcorner\; (\mathbf{b} \wedge \mathbf{c}))\star &&=
-\tfrac{1}{2} \left(\overset\Rightarrow{a}(\mathbf{b} \wedge \mathbf{c}) - (\mathbf{b} \wedge \mathbf{c}) \overset\Rightarrow{a} \right)
&& = -\overset\Rightarrow{a} \times (\mathbf{b} \wedge \mathbf{c}) \\
& (-\overset\Rightarrow{a} \times (\mathbf{b} \wedge \mathbf{c}))\star &&=
-\tfrac{1}{2}\left(\overset\Rightarrow{a}
\tfrac{1}{2}(\overset\Rightarrow{b}\mathbf{c} -\mathbf{c}\overset\Rightarrow{b})
-\tfrac{1}{2}(\overset\Rightarrow{b}\mathbf{c}-\mathbf{c}\overset\Rightarrow{b})
\overset\Rightarrow{a} \right)
&&= -\overset\Rightarrow{a} \times (\overset\Rightarrow{b} \cdot \mathbf{c}) \\
& (-\overset\Rightarrow{a} \times (\overset\Rightarrow{b} \cdot \mathbf{c}))\star &&=
-\tfrac{1}{2}\left(\overset\Rightarrow{a}
\tfrac{1}{2}(\overset\Rightarrow{b}\overset\Rightarrow{c}-\overset\Rightarrow{c}\overset\Rightarrow{b})
-\tfrac{1}{2}(\overset\Rightarrow{b}\overset\Rightarrow{c}-\overset\Rightarrow{c}\overset\Rightarrow{b})
\overset\Rightarrow{a} \right)
&&= \overset\Rightarrow{a}\times (\overset\Rightarrow{b}\times\overset\Rightarrow{c})
\end{alignat}$$

This was three duals. This must also be done to the left side.

$$\begin{align}
&((((\mathbf{a} \cdot \mathbf{c}) \mathbf{b} - (\mathbf{a} \cdot \mathbf{b}) \mathbf{c})\star) \star) \star \\
&= \tfrac{1}{2}(\overset\Rightarrow{a}\overset\Rightarrow{c} + \overset\Rightarrow{c}\overset\Rightarrow{a}) \overset\Rightarrow{b} -
\tfrac{1}{2}(\overset\Rightarrow{a}\overset\Rightarrow{b} + \overset\Rightarrow{b}\overset\Rightarrow{a}) \overset\Rightarrow{c} \\
&= (\overset\Rightarrow{a}\cdot \overset\Rightarrow{c})\overset\Rightarrow{b}+(\overset\Rightarrow{a}\cdot \overset\Rightarrow{b})\overset\Rightarrow{c}
\end{align}$$

By negating both side we obtain:

$$\overset\Rightarrow{a}\times (\overset\Rightarrow{b}\times\overset\Rightarrow{c})=-(\overset\Rightarrow{a}\cdot \overset\Rightarrow{c})\overset\Rightarrow{b}+(\overset\Rightarrow{a}\cdot \overset\Rightarrow{b})\overset\Rightarrow{c}$$

== Triple products using tensor notation ==
It can be useful in fields like differential geometry, special relativity and theoretical physics in general to express triple products components using tensor notation.

This is because such a representation provides a basis-invariant (or coordinate-independent) way of expressing the properties of the product.

The triple scalar product is expressed using the Levi-Civita symbol:
$$\mathbf{a} \cdot [\mathbf{b}\times \mathbf{c}] = \varepsilon_{ijk} a^i b^j c^k$$
while the triple vector product:
$$(\mathbf{a} \times [\mathbf{b}\times \mathbf{c}])_i = \varepsilon_{ijk} a^j \varepsilon^{k\ell m} b_\ell c_m = \varepsilon_{ijk}\varepsilon^{k\ell m} a^j  b_\ell c_m,$$
referring to the $i$-th component of the resulting vector. This can be simplified by performing a contraction on the Levi-Civita symbols, $\varepsilon_{ijk} \varepsilon^{k\ell m} = \delta^{\ell m}_{ij} = \delta^{\ell}_{i} \delta^{m}_{j} - \delta^{m}_{i} \delta^{\ell}_{j}\,,$ where $\delta^{i}_{j}$ is the Kronecker delta function ($\delta^{i}_{j} = 0$ when $i \neq j$ and $\delta^{i}_{j} = 1$ when $i = j$) and $\delta^{\ell m}_{ij}$ is the generalized Kronecker delta function. We can reason out this identity by recognizing that the index $k$ will be summed out leaving only $i$ and $j$. In the first term, we fix $i = \ell$ and thus $j=m$. Likewise, in the second term, we fix $i=m$ and thus $\ell = j$.

Returning to the triple cross product,
$$\begin{align}
\left(\mathbf{a} \times [\mathbf{b}\times \mathbf{c}]\right)_i &= \left(\delta^\ell_i \delta^m_j - \delta^m_i \delta^\ell_j\right) a^j  b_\ell c_m \\[1ex]
&= a^j b_i c_j - a^j  b_j c_i
= b_i(\mathbf{a}\cdot\mathbf{c}) - c_i(\mathbf{a}\cdot\mathbf{b})\,.
\end{align}$$

== See also ==
- Quadruple product
- Vector algebra relations
