= Outermorphism =

Unital algebra homomorphism of exterior algebras

In geometric algebra, the outermorphism of a linear function between vector spaces is a natural extension of the map to arbitrary multivectors. It is the unique unital algebra homomorphism of exterior algebras whose restriction to the vector spaces is the original function. (Note: See particularly Exterior algebra § Functoriality.) An outermorphism is also known as an exomorphism because it preserves the structure of the exterior product.

== Definition ==
Let $f$ be an $\mathbb{R}$-linear map from $V$ to $W$. The extension of $f$ to an outermorphism is the unique map $\textstyle \underline{\mathsf{f}} : \bigwedge(V) \to \bigwedge(W)$ satisfying

$$\underline{\mathsf{f}}(1) = 1$$
$$\underline{\mathsf{f}}(x) = f(x)$$
$$\underline{\mathsf{f}}(A \wedge B) = \underline{\mathsf{f}}(A) \wedge \underline{\mathsf{f}}(B)$$
$$\underline{\mathsf{f}}(A + B) = \underline{\mathsf{f}}(A) + \underline{\mathsf{f}}(B)$$

for all vectors $x$ and all multivectors $A$ and $B$, where $\textstyle \bigwedge(V)$ denotes the exterior algebra over $V$. That is, an outermorphism is a unital algebra homomorphism between exterior algebras.

The outermorphism inherits linearity properties of the original linear map. For example, we see that for scalars $\alpha$, $\beta$ and vectors $x$, $y$, $z$, the outermorphism is linear over bivectors:

$$\begin{align}\underline{\mathsf{f}} (\alpha x \wedge z + \beta y \wedge z) &= \underline{\mathsf{f}}((\alpha x + \beta y) \wedge z)\\[6pt]
&= f(\alpha x + \beta y) \wedge f(z) \\[6pt]
&= (\alpha f(x) + \beta f(y)) \wedge f(z) \\[6pt]
&= \alpha(f(x) \wedge f(z)) + \beta(f(y) \wedge f(z)) \\[6pt]
&= \alpha \, \underline{\mathsf{f}}(x \wedge z) + \beta \, \underline{\mathsf{f}}(y \wedge z),\end{align}$$

which extends through the axiom of distributivity over addition above to linearity over all multivectors.

== Adjoint ==
Let $\underline{\mathsf{f}}$ be an outermorphism. We define the adjoint of $\overline{\mathsf{f}}$ to be the outermorphism that satisfies the property

$$\overline{\mathsf{f}}(a) \cdot b = a \cdot \underline{\mathsf{f}}(b)$$

for all vectors $a$ and $b$, where $\cdot$ is the nondegenerate symmetric bilinear form (scalar product of vectors).

This results in the property that

$$\overline{\mathsf{f}}(A) * B = A * \underline{\mathsf{f}}(B)$$

for all multivectors $A$ and $B$, where $*$ is the scalar product of multivectors.

If geometric calculus is available, then the adjoint may be extracted more directly:

$$\overline{\mathsf{f}}(a) = \nabla_b \left\langle a\underline{\mathsf{f}}(b) \right\rangle .$$

The above definition of adjoint is like the definition of the transpose in matrix theory. When the context is clear, the underline below the function is often omitted.

== Properties ==
It follows from the definition at the beginning that the outermorphism of a multivector $A$ is grade-preserving:

$$\underline{\mathsf{f}}(\left\langle A \right\rangle_r) = \left\langle\underline{\mathsf{f}}(A)\right\rangle_r$$

where the notation $\langle ~ \rangle_r$ indicates the $r$-vector part of $A$.

Since any vector $x$ may be written as $x=1\wedge x$, it follows that scalars are unaffected with $\underline{\mathsf{f}}(1)=1$. (Note: Except for the case where $f$ is the zero map, when it is required by axiom.) Similarly, since there is only one pseudoscalar up to a scalar multiplier, we must have $\underline{\mathsf{f}}(I) \propto I$. The determinant is defined to be the proportionality factor:

$$\det\mathsf{f} = \underline{\mathsf{f}}(I) I^{-1}$$

The underline is not necessary in this context because the determinant of a function is the same as the determinant of its adjoint. The determinant of the composition of functions is the product of the determinants:

$$\det(\mathsf{f} \circ \mathsf{g}) = \det\mathsf{f} \det\mathsf{g}$$

If the determinant of a function is nonzero, then the function has an inverse given by

$$\underline{\mathsf{f}}^{-1}(X) = \frac{\overline{\mathsf{f}}(XI)I^{-1}}{\det\mathsf{f}} = \overline{\mathsf f}(XI) [\overline{\mathsf f}(I)]^{-1},$$

and so does its adjoint, with

$$\overline{\mathsf{f}}^{-1}(X) = \frac{I^{-1}\underline{\mathsf{f}}(IX)}{\det\mathsf{f}} = [\underline{\mathsf f}(I)]^{-1} \underline{\mathsf f}(IX) .$$

The concepts of eigenvalues and eigenvectors may be generalized to outermorphisms. Let $\lambda$ be a real number and let $B$ be a (nonzero) blade of grade $r$. We say that a $B$ is an eigenblade of the function with eigenvalue $\lambda$ if

$$\underline{\mathsf{f}}(B)=\lambda B .$$

It may seem strange to consider only real eigenvalues, since in linear algebra the eigenvalues of a matrix with all real entries can have complex eigenvalues. In geometric algebra, however, the blades of different grades can exhibit a complex structure. Since both vectors and pseudovectors can act as eigenblades, they may each have a set of eigenvalues matching the degrees of freedom of the complex eigenvalues that would be found in ordinary linear algebra.

== Examples ==
Simple maps

The identity map and the scalar projection operator are outermorphisms.

Versors

A rotation of a vector by a rotor $R$ is given by

$$f(x)=RxR^{-1}$$

with outermorphism

$$\underline{\mathsf{f}}(X) = RXR^{-1}.$$

We check that this is the correct form of the outermorphism. Since rotations are built from the geometric product, which has the distributive property, they must be linear. To see that rotations are also outermorphisms, we recall that rotations preserve angles between vectors:

$$x \cdot y = (RxR^{-1}) \cdot (RyR^{-1})$$

Next, we try inputting a higher grade element and check that it is consistent with the original rotation for vectors:

$$\begin{align}\underline{\mathsf{f}}(x \wedge y) &= R(x \wedge y)R^{-1} \\
&= R(xy - x \cdot y)R^{-1} \\
&= RxyR^{-1} - R(x \cdot y)R^{-1} \\
&= RxR^{-1} RyR^{-1} - x \cdot y \\
&= (RxR^{-1}) \wedge (RyR^{-1}) + (RxR^{-1}) \cdot (RyR^{-1}) - x \cdot y \\
&= (RxR^{-1}) \wedge (RyR^{-1}) + x \cdot y - x \cdot y \\
&= f(x) \wedge f(y) \end{align}$$

Orthogonal projection operators

The orthogonal projection operator $\mathcal{P}_B$ onto a blade $B$ is an outermorphism:

$$\mathcal{P}_B(x \wedge y) = \mathcal{P}_B(x) \wedge \mathcal{P}_B(y) .$$

Nonexample – orthogonal rejection operator

In contrast to the orthogonal projection operator, the orthogonal rejection $\mathcal{P}^\perp_B$ by a blade $B$ is linear but is not an outermorphism:

$$\mathcal{P}^\perp_B(1) = 1 - \mathcal{P}_B(1) = 0 \ne 1 .$$

Nonexample – grade projection operator

An example of a multivector-valued function of multivectors that is linear but is not an outermorphism is grade projection where the grade is nonzero, for example projection onto grade 1:

$$\langle x \wedge y \rangle_1 = 0$$
$$\langle x \rangle_1 \wedge \langle y \rangle_1 = x \wedge y$$
