= Universal geometric algebra =

In mathematics, a universal geometric algebra is a type of geometric algebra generated by real vector spaces endowed with an indefinite quadratic form. Some authors restrict this to the infinite-dimensional case.

The universal geometric algebra $\mathcal{G}$(n, n) of order 2^{2n} is defined as the Clifford algebra of 2n-dimensional pseudo-Euclidean space R^{n, n}. This algebra is also called the "mother algebra". It has a nondegenerate signature. The vectors in this space generate the algebra through the geometric product. This product makes the manipulation of vectors more similar to the familiar algebraic rules, although non-commutative.

When n = ∞, i.e. there are countably many dimensions, then $\mathcal{G}$(∞, ∞) is called simply the universal geometric algebra (UGA), which contains vector spaces such as R^{p, q} and their respective geometric algebras $\mathcal{G}$(p, q).

UGA contains all finite-dimensional geometric algebras (GA).

The elements of UGA are called multivectors. Every multivector can be written as the sum of several r-vectors. Some r-vectors are scalars (r = 0), vectors (r = 1) and bivectors (r = 2).

One may generate a finite-dimensional GA by choosing a unit pseudoscalar (I). The set of all vectors that satisfy

$$a\wedge I=0$$

is a vector space. The geometric product of the vectors in this vector space then defines the GA, of which I is a member. Since every finite-dimensional GA has a unique I (up to a sign), one can define or characterize the GA by it. A pseudoscalar can be interpreted as an n-plane segment of unit area in an n-dimensional vector space.

== Vector manifolds ==
A vector manifold is a special set of vectors in the UGA. These vectors generate a set of linear spaces tangent to the vector manifold. Vector manifolds were introduced to do calculus on manifolds so one can define (differentiable) manifolds as a set isomorphic to a vector manifold. The difference lies in that a vector manifold is algebraically rich while a manifold is not. Since this is the primary motivation for vector manifolds the following interpretation is rewarding.

Consider a vector manifold as a special set of "points". These points are members of an algebra and so can be added and multiplied. These points generate a tangent space of definite dimension "at" each point. This tangent space generates a (unit) pseudoscalar which is a function of the points of the vector manifold. A vector manifold is characterized by its pseudoscalar. The pseudoscalar can be interpreted as a tangent oriented n-plane segment of unit area. Bearing this in mind, a manifold looks locally like R^{n} at every point.

Although a vector manifold can be treated as a completely abstract object, a geometric algebra is created so that every element of the algebra represents a geometric object and algebraic operations such as adding and multiplying correspond to geometric transformations.

Consider a set of vectors {x} = M^{n} in UGA. If this set of vectors generates a set of "tangent" simple (n + 1)-vectors, which is to say

$$\forall x\in M^n: \exists I_n(x)=x\wedge A(x) \mid I_n(x)\lor M_n=x$$

then M^{n} is a vector manifold, the value of A is that of a simple n-vector. If one interprets these vectors as points then I_{n}(x) is the pseudoscalar of an algebra tangent to M^{n} at x. I_{n}(x) can be interpreted as a unit area at an oriented n-plane: this is why it is labeled with n. The function I_{n} gives a distribution of these tangent n-planes over M^{n}.

A vector manifold is defined similarly to how a particular GA can be defined, by its unit pseudoscalar. The set {x} is not closed under addition and multiplication by scalars. This set is not a vector space. At every point the vectors generate a tangent space of definite dimension. The vectors in this tangent space are different from the vectors of the vector manifold. In comparison to the original set they are bivectors, but since they span a linear space—the tangent space—they are also referred to as vectors. Notice that the dimension of this space is the dimension of the manifold. This linear space generates an algebra and its unit pseudoscalar characterizes the vector manifold. This is the manner in which the set of abstract vectors {x} defines the vector manifold. Once the set of "points" generates the "tangent space" the "tangent algebra" and its "pseudoscalar" follow immediately.

The unit pseudoscalar of the vector manifold is a (pseudoscalar-valued) function of the points on the vector manifold. If i.e. this function is smooth then one says that the vector manifold is smooth. A manifold can be defined as a set isomorphic to a vector manifold. The points of a manifold do not have any algebraic structure and pertain only to the set itself. This is the main difference between a vector manifold and a manifold that is isomorphic. A vector manifold is always a subset of Universal Geometric Algebra by definition and the elements can be manipulated algebraically. In contrast, a manifold is not a subset of any set other than itself, but the elements have no algebraic relation among them.

The differential geometry of a manifold can be carried out in a vector manifold. All quantities relevant to differential geometry can be calculated from I_{n}(x) if it is a differentiable function. This is the original motivation behind its definition. Vector manifolds allow an approach to the differential geometry of manifolds alternative to the "build-up" approach where structures such as metrics, connections and fiber bundles are introduced as needed. The relevant structure of a vector manifold is its tangent algebra. The use of geometric calculus along with the definition of vector manifold allow the study of geometric properties of manifolds without using coordinates.

== See also ==
- Conformal geometric algebra
