= Joan Lasenby =

British applied mathematician

Joan Lasenby is a British physicist, engineer, and applied mathematician whose research interests include 3D reconstruction and motion capture, geometric algebra, inverse kinematics, and the applications of structured light plethysmography in non-invasive medical diagnostics. She is Professor of Image and Signal Analysis in the University of Cambridge Department of Engineering, and College Lecturer and Director of Studies in Engineering for Trinity College, Cambridge.

== Education and career ==
Lasenby grew up in Liverpool, and entered Trinity College, Cambridge in 1978, as one of the first women to enter the college. She read mathematics there, entered graduate study at Louisiana State University, returned to Cambridge for Part III of the Mathematical Tripos, and completed a Ph.D., on radio and molecular studies of the galactic centre, through Cambridge's Cavendish Laboratory.

Before taking her present position, she held a Junior Research Fellowship in Trinity Hall, Cambridge from 1987 until 1990, did a year of postdoctoral research at the Marconi Research Centre, and held a Royal Society University Research Fellowship for research into Applications of Geometric Algebra in Engineering in Newnham College, Cambridge, from 1994 until 2000.

== Books ==
Lasenby has edited two books on geometric algebra:

- Applications of Geometric Algebra in Computer Science and Engineering (with Leo Dorst and Chris Doran, Springer, 2002)
- Guide to Geometric Algebra in Practice (with Leo Dorst, Springer, 2011)
