= Rotor (mathematics) =

Object in geometric algebra

A rotor is an object in the geometric algebra (also called Clifford algebra) of a vector space that represents a rotation about the origin. More precisely, each rotation is represented by exactly two rotors, differing by sign. The term originated with William Kingdon Clifford, in showing that the quaternion algebra is just a special case of Hermann Grassmann's "theory of extension" (Ausdehnungslehre). Hestenes defined a rotor to be an element $R$ of a geometric algebra that can be written as the product of an even number of unit vectors and satisfies $R\tilde R = 1$, where $\tilde R$ is the "reverse" of $R$.

== Definition ==
In geometric algebra, a rotor is an element of the spin group. We define this group below.

Let $V$ be a vector space equipped with a positive definite quadratic form $Q$, and let $\mathcal{C}\ell(V,Q)$ be the geometric algebra associated to $V$. The algebra $\mathcal{C}\ell(V,Q)$ is the quotient of the tensor algebra of $V$ by the relations $v\otimes v=Q(v)1$ for all $v\in V$. (The product induced from the tensor algebra is called the geometric product in geometric algebra.) The $\mathbb{Z}$-grading on the tensor algebra of $V$ descends modulo 2 to a $\mathbb{Z}/2\mathbb{Z}$-grading on $\mathcal{C}\ell(V,Q)$, which we denote by
$$\mathcal C\ell(V,Q) =
\mathcal C\ell^{\mathrm{even}}(V,Q)
\oplus
\mathcal C\ell^{\mathrm{odd}}(V,Q).$$
Here, $\mathcal{C}\ell^{\mathrm{even}}(V,Q)$ is spanned by even-grade blades and $\mathcal{C}\ell^{\mathrm{odd}}(V,Q)$ is spanned by odd-grade blades.

There is a unique anti-automorphism of $\mathcal{C}\ell(V,Q)$ which restricts to the identity on $V$: this is called reversion, and the reverse of any multivector $a$ is denoted by $\widetilde{a}$. On a blade, it simply reverses the order of the factors. The spin group $\operatorname{Spin}(V,Q)$ is defined to be the subgroup of $\mathcal{C}\ell^{\mathrm{even}}(V,Q)$ consisting of multivectors that can be written as a product of an even number of unit vectors. Such multivectors $R$ satisfy $R^tR=1$.

== Action as rotation on the vector space ==
α > θ/2

α < θ/2

Rotation of a vector a through angle θ, as a double reflection along two unit vectors n and m, separated by angle θ/2 (not just θ). Each prime on a indicates a reflection. The plane of the diagram is the plane of rotation.

Reflections along a vector in geometric algebra may be represented as (minus) sandwiching a multivector M between a non-null vector v perpendicular to the hyperplane of reflection and that vector's inverse v^{−1}:

$$-vMv^{-1}$$

and are of even grade. Under a rotation generated by the rotor R, a general multivector M will transform double-sidedly as

$$RMR^{-1}.$$

This action gives a surjective homomorphism $\operatorname{Spin}(V)\to \operatorname{SO}(V)$ presenting Spin(V) as a double cover of SO(V). (See Spin group for more details.)

=== Restricted alternative formulation ===
For a Euclidean space, it may be convenient to consider an alternative formulation, and some authors define the operation of reflection as (minus) the sandwiching of a unit (i.e. normalized) multivector:

$$-vMv, \quad v^2=1 ,$$

forming rotors that are automatically normalised:

$$R\tilde R = \tilde RR = 1 .$$

The derived rotor action is then expressed as a sandwich product with the reverse:

$$RM\tilde R$$

For a reflection for which the associated vector squares to a negative scalar, as may be the case with a pseudo-Euclidean space, such a vector can only be normalized up to the sign of its square, and additional bookkeeping of the sign of the application the rotor becomes necessary. The formulation in terms of the sandwich product with the inverse as above suffers no such shortcoming.

=== Rotations of multivectors and spinors ===
However, though as multivectors also transform double-sidedly, rotors can be combined and form a group, and so multiple rotors compose single-sidedly. The alternative formulation above is not self-normalizing and motivates the definition of spinor in geometric algebra as an object that transforms single-sidedly – i.e., spinors may be regarded as non-normalised rotors in which the reverse rather than the inverse is used in the sandwich product.

== Homogeneous representation algebras ==
In homogeneous representation algebras such as conformal geometric algebra, a rotor in the representation space corresponds to a rotation about an arbitrary point, a translation or possibly another transformation in the base space.

== See also ==
- Double rotation
- Lie group
- Euler's formula
- Generator (mathematics)
- Versor
