= Geometric calculus =

Infinitesimal calculus on functions defined on a geometric algebra

In mathematics, geometric calculus extends geometric algebra to include differentiation and integration. The formalism is powerful and can be shown to reproduce other mathematical theories including vector calculus, differential geometry, and differential forms.

== Differentiation ==
With a geometric algebra given, let $a$ and $b$ be vectors and let $F$ be a multivector-valued function of a vector. The directional derivative of $F$ along $b$ at $a$ is defined as
$$(\nabla_b F)(a) = \lim_{\epsilon \rightarrow 0}{\frac{F(a + \epsilon b) - F(a)}{\epsilon}},$$
provided that the limit exists for all $b$, where the limit is taken for scalar $\epsilon$. This is similar to the usual definition of a directional derivative but extends it to functions that are not necessarily scalar-valued.

Next, choose a set of basis vectors $\{e_i\}$ and consider the operators, denoted $\partial_i$, that perform directional derivatives in the directions of $e_i$:
$$\partial_i : F \mapsto (x\mapsto (\nabla_{e_i} F)(x)).$$

Then, using the Einstein summation notation, consider the operator:
$$e^i\partial_i,$$
which means
$$F \mapsto e^i\partial_i F,$$
where the geometric product is applied after the directional derivative. More verbosely:
$$F \mapsto (x\mapsto e^i(\nabla_{e_i} F)(x)).$$

This operator is independent of the choice of frame, and can thus be used to define what in geometric calculus is called the vector derivative:
$$\nabla = e^i\partial_i.$$

This is similar to the usual definition of the gradient, but it, too, extends to functions that are not necessarily scalar-valued.

The directional derivative is linear regarding its direction, that is:
$$\nabla_{\alpha a + \beta b} = \alpha\nabla_a + \beta\nabla_b.$$
From this follows that the directional derivative is the inner product of its direction by the vector derivative. All needs to be observed is that the direction $a$ can be written $a = (a\cdot e^i) e_i$, so that:
$$\nabla_a = \nabla_{(a\cdot e^i)e_i} = (a\cdot e^i)\nabla_{e_i} = a\cdot(e^i\nabla_{e_i}) = a\cdot \nabla.$$
For this reason, $\nabla_a F(x)$ is often noted $a\cdot \nabla F(x)$.

The standard order of operations for the vector derivative is that it acts only on the function closest to its immediate right. Given two functions $F$ and $G$, then for example we have
$$\nabla FG = (\nabla F)G.$$

=== Product rule ===
Although the partial derivative exhibits a product rule, the vector derivative only partially inherits this property. Consider two functions $F$ and $G$:
$$\begin{align}\nabla(FG) &= e^i\partial_i(FG) \\
&= e^i((\partial_iF)G+F(\partial_iG)) \\
&= e^i(\partial_iF)G+e^iF(\partial_iG). \end{align}$$

Since the geometric product is not commutative with $e^iF \ne Fe^i$ in general, we need a new notation to proceed. A solution is to adopt the overdot notation, in which the scope of a vector derivative with an overdot is the multivector-valued function sharing the same overdot. In this case, if we define
$$\dot{\nabla}F\dot{G}=e^iF(\partial_iG),$$
then the product rule for the vector derivative is
$$\nabla(FG) = \nabla FG+\dot{\nabla}F\dot{G}.$$

=== Interior and exterior derivative ===
Let $F$ be an $r$-grade multivector. Then we can define an additional pair of operators, the interior and exterior derivatives,
$$\begin{align}
\nabla \cdot F &= \langle \nabla F \rangle_{r-1} = e^i \cdot \partial_i F, \\
\nabla \wedge F &= \langle \nabla F \rangle_{r+1} = e^i \wedge \partial_i F.
\end{align}$$

In particular, if $F$ is grade 1 (vector-valued function), then we can write
$$\nabla F = \nabla \cdot F + \nabla \wedge F$$
and identify the divergence and curl as
$$\begin{align}
\nabla \cdot F &= \operatorname{div} F, \\
\nabla \wedge F &= I \operatorname{curl} F.
\end{align}$$

Unlike the vector derivative, neither the interior derivative operator nor the exterior derivative operator is invertible.

=== Multivector derivative ===
The derivative with respect to a vector as discussed above can be generalized to a derivative with respect to a general multivector, called the multivector derivative.

Let $F$ be a multivector-valued function of a multivector. The directional derivative of $F$ with respect to $X$ in the direction $A$, where $X$ and $A$ are multivectors, is defined as
$$A*\partial_X F(X)=\lim_{\epsilon\to 0}\frac{F(X+\epsilon A)-F(X)}{\epsilon}\ ,$$
where $A* B=\langle A B\rangle$ is the scalar product. With $\{e_i\}$ a vector basis and $\{e^i\}$ the corresponding dual basis, the multivector derivative is defined in terms of the directional derivative as
$$\frac{\partial}{\partial X}=\partial_X=\sum_{i<\dots<j}e^i\wedge\cdots\wedge e^j(e_j\wedge\cdots\wedge e_i)*\partial_X\ .$$
This equation is just expressing $\partial_X$ in terms of components in a reciprocal basis of blades, as discussed in the article section Geometric algebra#Dual basis.

A key property of the multivector derivative is that
$$\partial_X\langle X A\rangle=P_X(A)\ ,$$
where $P_X(A)$ is the projection of $A$ onto the grades contained in $X$.

The multivector derivative finds applications in Lagrangian field theory.

== Integration ==
Let $\{e_1, \ldots, e_n\}$ be a set of basis vectors that span an $n$-dimensional vector space. From geometric algebra, we interpret the pseudoscalar $e_1 \wedge e_2 \wedge\cdots\wedge e_n$ to be the signed volume of the $n$-parallelotope subtended by these basis vectors. If the basis vectors are orthonormal, then this is the unit pseudoscalar.

More generally, we may restrict ourselves to a subset of $k$ of the basis vectors, where $1 \le k \le n$, to treat the length, area, or other general $k$-volume of a subspace in the overall $n$-dimensional vector space. We denote these selected basis vectors by $\{e_{i_1}, \ldots, e_{i_k} \}$. A general $k$-volume of the $k$-parallelotope subtended by these basis vectors is the grade $k$ multivector $e_{i_1} \wedge e_{i_2} \wedge\cdots\wedge e_{i_k}$.

Even more generally, we may consider a new set of vectors $\{x^{i_1}e_{i_1}, \ldots, x^{i_k}e_{i_k} \}$ proportional to the $k$ basis vectors, where each of the $\{x^{i_j}\}$ is a component that scales one of the basis vectors. We are free to choose components as infinitesimally small as we wish as long as they remain nonzero. Since the outer product of these terms can be interpreted as a $k$-volume, a natural way to define a measure is
$$\begin{align} d^kX
&= \left(dx^{i_1} e_{i_1}\right) \wedge \left(dx^{i_2}e_{i_2}\right) \wedge\cdots\wedge \left(dx^{i_k}e_{i_k}\right) \\
&= \left( e_{i_1}\wedge e_{i_2}\wedge\cdots\wedge e_{i_k} \right) dx^{i_1} dx^{i_2} \cdots dx^{i_k}.
\end{align}$$

The measure is therefore always proportional to the unit pseudoscalar of a $k$-dimensional subspace of the vector space. Compare the Riemannian volume form in the theory of differential forms. The integral is taken with respect to this measure:
$$\int_V F(x)\,d^kX = \int_V F(x) \left( e_{i_1}\wedge e_{i_2}\wedge\cdots\wedge e_{i_k} \right) dx^{i_1} dx^{i_2} \cdots dx^{i_k}.$$

More formally, consider some directed volume $V$ of the subspace. We may divide this volume into a sum of simplices. Let $\{x_i\}$ be the coordinates of the vertices. At each vertex we assign a measure $\Delta U_i(x)$ as the average measure of the simplices sharing the vertex. Then the integral of $F(x)$ with respect to $U(x)$ over this volume is obtained in the limit of finer partitioning of the volume into smaller simplices:
$$\int_V F\,dU = \lim_{n \rightarrow \infty} \sum_{i=1}^n F(x_i)\,\Delta U_i(x_i).$$

=== Fundamental theorem of geometric calculus ===
The reason for defining the vector derivative and integral as above is that they allow a strong generalization of Stokes' theorem. Let $\mathsf{L}(A;x)$ be a multivector-valued function of $r$-grade input $A$ and general position $x$, linear in its first argument. Then the fundamental theorem of geometric calculus relates the integral of a derivative over the volume $V$ to the integral over its boundary:
$$\int_V \dot{\mathsf{L}} \left(\dot{\nabla} dX;x \right) = \oint_{\partial V} \mathsf{L} (dS;x).$$

As an example, let $\mathsf{L}(A;x)=\langle F(x) A I^{-1} \rangle$ for a vector-valued function $F(x)$ and a ($n-1$)-grade multivector $A$. We find that
$$\begin{align} \int_V \dot{\mathsf{L}} \left(\dot{\nabla} dX;x \right)
&= \int_V \langle\dot{F}(x)\dot{\nabla}\,dX\,I^{-1} \rangle \\
&= \int_V \langle\dot{F}(x)\dot{\nabla}\,|dX| \rangle \\
&= \int_V \nabla \cdot F(x)\,|dX|.
\end{align}$$

Likewise,
$$\begin{align} \oint_{\partial V} \mathsf{L} (dS;x)
&= \oint_{\partial V} \langle F(x)\,dS\,I^{-1} \rangle \\
&= \oint_{\partial V} \langle F(x) \hat{n}\,|dS| \rangle \\
&= \oint_{\partial V} F(x) \cdot \hat{n}\,|dS|.
\end{align}$$

Thus we recover the divergence theorem,
$$\int_V \nabla \cdot F(x)\,|dX| = \oint_{\partial V} F(x) \cdot \hat{n}\,|dS|.$$

== Covariant derivative ==
A sufficiently smooth $k$-surface in an $n$-dimensional space is deemed a manifold. To each point on the manifold, we may attach a $k$-blade $B$ that is tangent to the manifold. Locally, $B$ acts as a pseudoscalar of the $k$-dimensional space. This blade defines a projection of vectors onto the manifold:
$$\mathcal{P}_B (A) = (A \cdot B^{-1}) B.$$

Just as the vector derivative $\nabla$ is defined over the entire $n$-dimensional space, we may wish to define an intrinsic derivative $\partial$, locally defined on the manifold:
$$\partial F = \mathcal{P}_B (\nabla )F.$$

(Note: The right hand side of the above may not lie in the tangent space to the manifold. Therefore, it is not the same as $\mathcal{P}_B (\nabla F)$, which necessarily does lie in the tangent space.)

If $a$ is a vector tangent to the manifold, then indeed both the vector derivative and intrinsic derivative give the same directional derivative:
$$a \cdot \partial F = a \cdot \nabla F.$$

Although this operation is perfectly valid, it is not always useful because $\partial F$ itself is not necessarily on the manifold. Therefore, we define the covariant derivative to be the forced projection of the intrinsic derivative back onto the manifold:
$$a \cdot DF = \mathcal{P}_B (a \cdot \partial F) = \mathcal{P}_B (a \cdot \mathcal{P}_B (\nabla) F).$$

Since any general multivector can be expressed as a sum of a projection and a rejection, in this case
$$a \cdot \partial F = \mathcal{P}_B (a \cdot \partial F) + \mathcal{P}_B^{\perp} (a \cdot \partial F),$$
we introduce a new function, the shape tensor $\mathsf{S}(a)$, which satisfies
$$F \times \mathsf{S}(a) = \mathcal{P}_B^{\perp} (a \cdot \partial F),$$
where $\times$ is the commutator product. In a local coordinate basis $\{e_i\}$ spanning the tangent surface, the shape tensor is given by
$$\mathsf{S}(a) = e^i \wedge \mathcal{P}_B^{\perp} (a \cdot \partial e_i).$$

Importantly, on a general manifold, the covariant derivative does not commute. In particular, the commutator is related to the shape tensor by
$$[a \cdot D, \, b \cdot D]F=-(\mathsf{S}(a) \times \mathsf{S}(b)) \times F.$$

Clearly the term $\mathsf{S}(a) \times \mathsf{S}(b)$ is of interest. However it, like the intrinsic derivative, is not necessarily on the manifold. Therefore, we can define the Riemann tensor to be the projection back onto the manifold:
$$\mathsf{R}(a \wedge b)=-\mathcal{P}_B (\mathsf{S}(a) \times \mathsf{S}(b)).$$

Lastly, if $F$ is of grade $r$, then we can define interior and exterior covariant derivatives as
$$\begin{align}
D \cdot F  &= \langle DF \rangle_{r-1}, \\
D \wedge F &= \langle DF \rangle_{r+1}, \\
\end{align}$$
and likewise for the intrinsic derivative.

== Relation to differential geometry ==
On a manifold, locally we may assign a tangent surface spanned by a set of basis vectors $\{e_i\}$. We can associate the components of a metric tensor, the Christoffel symbols, and the Riemann curvature tensor as follows:

$$\begin{align}
g_{ij} &= e_i \cdot e_j, \\
\Gamma^k_{ij} &= (e_i \cdot De_j) \cdot e^k, \\
R_{ijkl} &= (\mathsf{R}(e_i \wedge e_j) \cdot e_k) \cdot e_l.
\end{align}$$

These relations embed the theory of differential geometry within geometric calculus.

== Relation to differential forms ==
In a local coordinate system ($x^1, \ldots, x^n$), the coordinate differentials $dx^1, \ldots, dx^n$ form a basic set of one-forms within the coordinate chart. Given a multi-index $I = (i_1, \ldots, i_k)$ with $1 \le i_p \le n$ for $1 \le p \le k$, we can define a $k$-form
$$\omega = f_I\,dx^I=f_{i_1 i_2\cdots i_k}\,dx^{i_1}\wedge dx^{i_2}\wedge\cdots\wedge dx^{i_k}.$$

We can alternatively introduce a $k$-grade multivector $A$ as
$$A = f_{i_1i_2\cdots i_k}e^{i_1}\wedge e^{i_2}\wedge\cdots\wedge e^{i_k}$$
and a measure
$$\begin{align} d^kX
&= \left(dx^{i_1} e_{i_1}\right) \wedge \left(dx^{i_2}e_{i_2}\right) \wedge\cdots\wedge \left(dx^{i_k}e_{i_k}\right) \\
&= \left( e_{i_1}\wedge e_{i_2}\wedge\cdots\wedge e_{i_k} \right) dx^{i_1} dx^{i_2} \cdots dx^{i_k}.
\end{align}$$

Apart from a subtle difference in meaning for the exterior product with respect to differential forms versus the exterior product with respect to vectors (in the former the increments are covectors, whereas in the latter they represent scalars), we see the correspondences of the differential form
$$\omega \cong A^{\dagger} \cdot d^kX = A \cdot \left(d^kX \right)^{\dagger},$$
its derivative
$$d\omega \cong (D \wedge A)^{\dagger} \cdot d^{k+1}X = (D \wedge A) \cdot \left(d^{k+1}X \right)^{\dagger},$$
and its Hodge dual
$$\star\omega \cong (I^{-1} A)^{\dagger} \cdot d^kX,$$
embed the theory of differential forms within geometric calculus.

== History ==
Following is a diagram summarizing the history of geometric calculus.

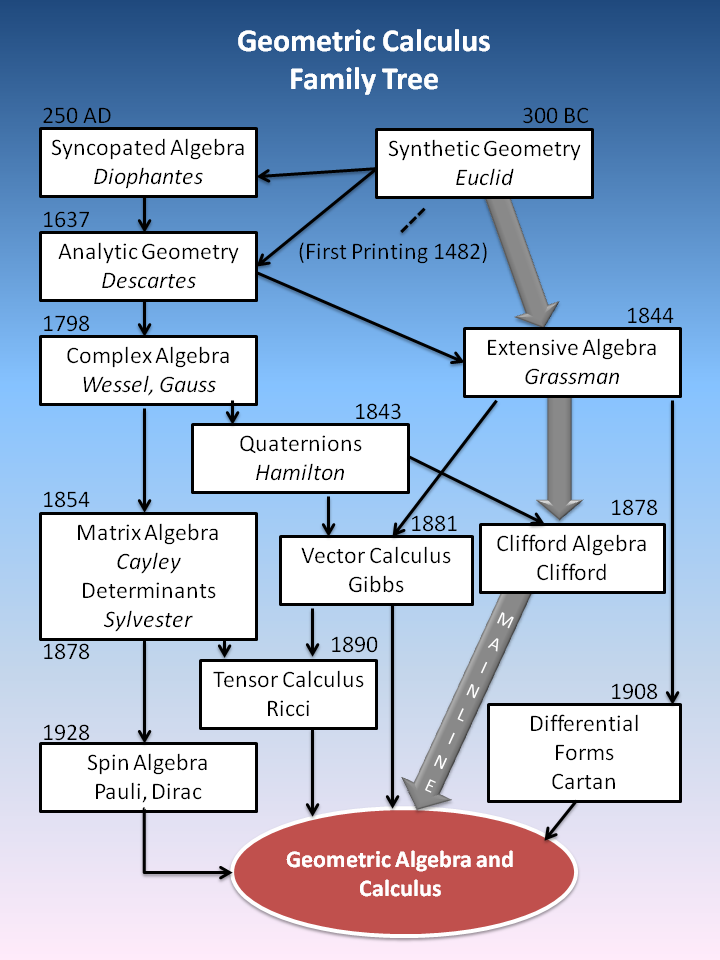
History of geometric calculus.

== References and further reading ==
- Macdonald, Alan (2012). Vector and Geometric Calculus. Charleston: CreateSpace. ISBN 9781480132450. OCLC 829395829.
