= Pseudoscalar =

Scalar quantity, changing sign in mirrored coordinates

In linear algebra, a pseudoscalar is a quantity that behaves like a scalar, except that it changes sign under a parity inversion while a true scalar does not.

A pseudoscalar, when multiplied by an ordinary vector, becomes a pseudovector (or axial vector); a similar construction creates the pseudotensor. A pseudoscalar also results from any scalar product between a pseudovector and an ordinary vector. The prototypical example of a pseudoscalar is the scalar triple product, which can be written as the scalar product between one of the vectors in the triple product and the cross product between the two other vectors, where the latter is a pseudovector.

== In physics ==
In physics, a pseudoscalar denotes a physical quantity analogous to a scalar. Both are physical quantities which assume a single value which is invariant under proper rotations. However, under the parity transformation, pseudoscalars flip their signs while scalars do not. As reflections through a plane are the combination of a rotation with the parity transformation, pseudoscalars also change signs under reflections.

=== Motivation ===
One of the most powerful ideas in physics is that physical laws do not change when one changes the coordinate system used to describe these laws. That a pseudoscalar reverses its sign when the coordinate axes are inverted suggests that it is not the best object to describe a physical quantity. In 3D-space, quantities described by a pseudovector are antisymmetric tensors of order 2, which are invariant under inversion. The pseudovector may be a simpler representation of that quantity, but suffers from the change of sign under inversion. Similarly, in 3D-space, the Hodge dual of a scalar is equal to a constant times the 3-dimensional Levi-Civita pseudotensor (or "permutation" pseudotensor); whereas the Hodge dual of a pseudoscalar is an antisymmetric (pure) tensor of order three. The Levi-Civita pseudotensor is a completely antisymmetric pseudotensor of order 3. Since the dual of the pseudoscalar is the product of two "pseudo-quantities", the resulting tensor is a true tensor, and does not change sign upon an inversion of axes. The situation is similar to the situation for pseudovectors and antisymmetric tensors of order 2. The dual of a pseudovector is an antisymmetric tensor of order 2 (and vice versa). The tensor is an invariant physical quantity under a coordinate inversion, while the pseudovector is not invariant.

The situation can be extended to any dimension. Generally in an n-dimensional space the Hodge dual of an order r tensor will be an antisymmetric pseudotensor of order (n − r) and vice versa. In particular, in the four-dimensional spacetime of special relativity, a pseudoscalar is the dual of a fourth-order tensor and is proportional to the four-dimensional Levi-Civita pseudotensor.

=== Examples ===
- The stream function $\psi(x,y)$ for a two-dimensional, incompressible fluid flow $\mathbf{v}(x,y)=\langle \partial_{y}\psi,-\partial_{x}\psi\rangle$.
- Magnetic charge is a pseudoscalar as it is mathematically defined, regardless of whether it exists physically.
- Helicity is the projection (dot product) of a spin pseudovector onto the direction of momentum (a true vector).
- Pseudoscalar particles, i.e. particles with spin 0 and odd parity, that is, a particle with no intrinsic spin with wave function that changes sign under parity inversion. Examples are pseudoscalar mesons.

== In geometric algebra ==
A pseudoscalar in a geometric algebra is a highest-grade element of the algebra. For example, in two dimensions there are two orthogonal basis vectors, $e_1$, $e_2$ and the associated highest-grade basis element is
$$e_1 e_2 = e_{12}.$$
So a pseudoscalar is a multiple of $e_{12}$. The element $e_{12}$ squares to −1 and commutes with all even elements – behaving therefore like the imaginary scalar $i$ in the complex numbers. It is these scalar-like properties which give rise to its name.

In this setting, a pseudoscalar changes sign under a parity inversion, since if
$$(e_1,e_2) \mapsto (u_1, u_2)$$
is a change of basis representing an orthogonal transformation, then
$$e_1 e_2 \mapsto u_1 u_2 = \pm e_1 e_2,$$

where the sign depends on the determinant of the transformation. Pseudoscalars in geometric algebra thus correspond to the pseudoscalars in physics.
