= CCM =

CCM may refer to:

== Computing ==
- CCM mode, an encryption algorithm
- Client Configuration Manager, a component of Microsoft System Center Configuration Manager
- Combined Cipher Machine, a WWII-era cipher system
- Community Climate Model, predecessor of the Community Climate System Model
- Constrained conditional model, a machine-learning framework
- Convergent cross mapping, a test for cause-and-effect relationships
- CORBA Component Model
- Customer communications management, a type of software

== Government ==
- Center for Countermeasures, a US White Sands Proving Grounds operation
- Chama Cha Mapinduzi, the ruling political party in Tanzania
- Convention on Cluster Munitions, a 2010 international treaty prohibiting cluster bombs

== Job titles ==
- Certified Case Manager, an accreditation for health care providers
- Certified Consulting Meteorologist, an accreditation of the American Meteorological Society (AMS)
- Command Chief Master Sergeant, a rank and billet in the U.S. Air Force
- Certified Construction Manager, an accreditation by the Construction Management Association of America

== Music ==
- Contemporary Christian music
- Contemporary classical music
- Contemporary commercial music
- University of Cincinnati – College-Conservatory of Music
- CCM Magazine, an online publication

== Schools and organizations ==
- Cardinal Courier Media, an overseeing body at St. John Fisher College
- City College of Manila, Philippines
- Council of Churches of Malaysia, an ecumenical fellowship in Malaysia
- County College of Morris, New Jersey, United States

== Science and medicine ==
- Calcium concentration microdomains, part of a cell's cytoplasm
- Carbon concentrating mechanisms, a photosynthesis condition in plants
- Cardiac contractility modulation, a therapy for heart failure
- Cerebral cavernous malformation, a type of venous malformation in the brain
- Climate change mitigation, climate change topic
- Convergent cross mapping, a statistical test

== Places ==
- Cape Cod Mall, a shopping mall in Hyannis, Massachusetts
- Macao Cultural Centre, Macau, China

== Sport ==
- CCM (bicycle company), a Canadian bicycle manufacturer
- CCM (ice hockey), a Canadian sporting goods brand
- Central Coast Mariners FC, an Australian A-League football team
- Clews Competition Motorcycles, a British motorcycle manufacturer

== Transportation ==
- CCM Airlines, an airline of Corsica, France
- Combatant Craft Medium, a U.S. Navy patrol boat
- Core Cabin Module, a part of the Chinese space station

== Other uses ==
- Cubic centimetre (ccm), metric unit of volume
- Catherine Cortez Masto (born 1964), United States Senator from Nevada
- Caja Castilla-La Mancha, a former Spanish savings bank
- Celestial Classic Movies, a Chinese pay-TV movie channel
- Moroccan Cinematographic Center, a public institution responsible for regulating and promoting the Moroccan film industry
