= Rodolfo Llinás =

Colombian neuroscientist (born 1934)

- Rodolfo Llinás Riascos
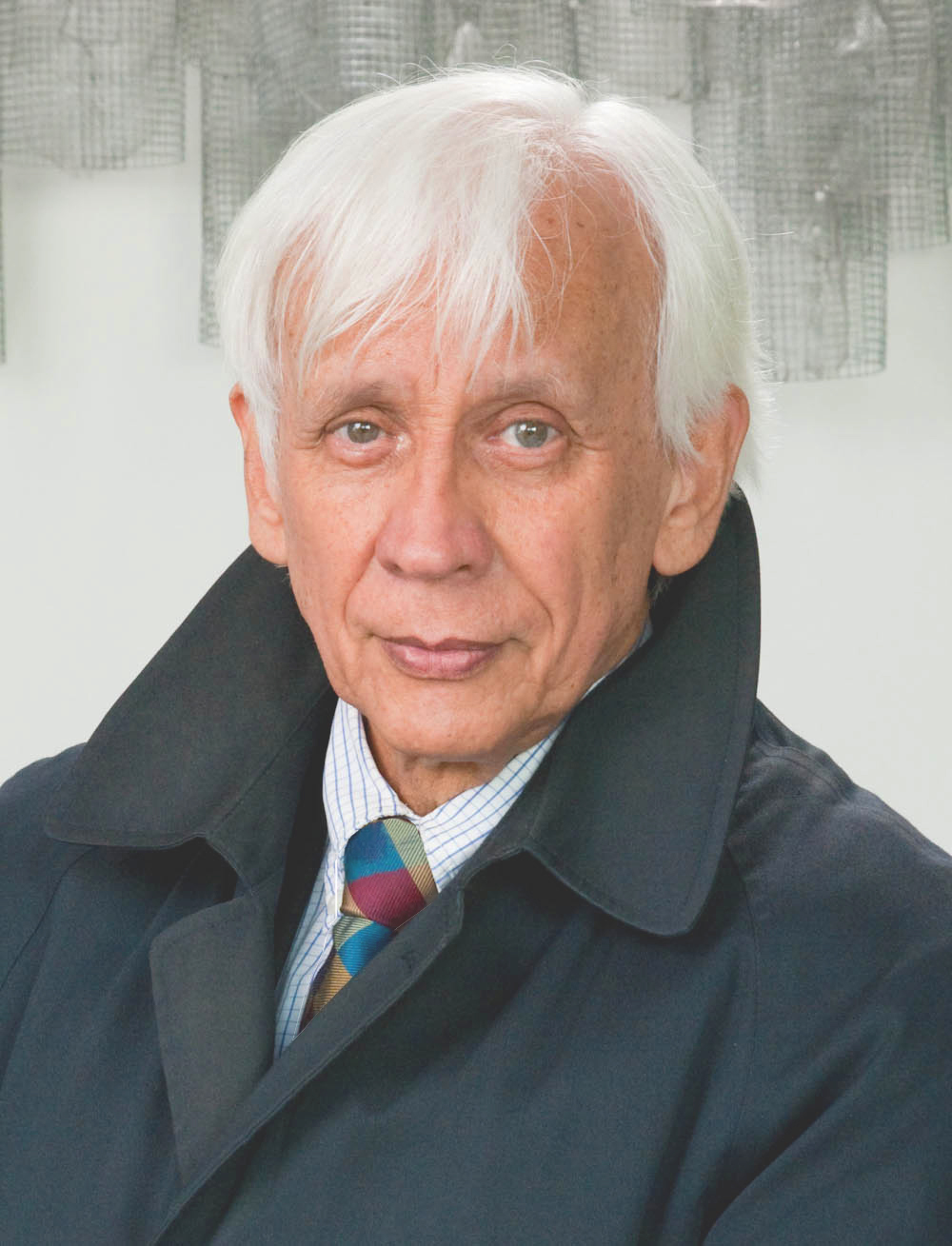
- Born: 16 December 1934 (age 91); Bogotá, Colombia
- Education: Pontificia Universidad Javeriana and Australian National University
- Known for: Physiology of the cerebellum, the thalamus, Thalamocortical dysrhythmia as well as for his pioneering work on the inferior olivary nucleus, on the squid giant synapse and on human magnetoencephalography (MEG)
- Awards: Ralph W. Gerard Prize (2018)
- Scientific career
- Fields: Neuroscience
- Workplaces: NYU School of Medicine
- Doctoral advisor: Sir John Eccles

Rodolfo Llinás Riascos (born 16 December 1934) is a Colombian neuroscientist. He is currently the Thomas and Suzanne Murphy Professor of Neuroscience and Chairman Emeritus of the Department of Physiology & Neuroscience at the NYU School of Medicine. Llinás has published over 800 scientific articles.

== Early life ==
Llinás was born in Bogotá, Colombia. He is the son of Jorge Enrique Llinás (a surgeon of Spanish descent, whose family arrived in Colombia at the end of the 19th century) and Bertha Riascos. He was motivated to study the brain by watching his grandfather Pablo Llinás Olarte working as a neuropsychiatrist. Llinás describes himself as a logical positivist.

== Education and early research ==
Llinás went to the Gimnasio Moderno school in Bogotá and graduated as a medical doctor from the Pontifical Xavierian University in 1959. During his medical studies he had the opportunity to travel to Europe and there he met several researchers in Spain, France and finally Switzerland, where he participated in neurophysiology experiments with Dr. Walter Rudolf Hess, Nobel Prize in Physiology, Medicine, professor and director of the Department of the Institute of Physiology of the University of Zurich. Additionally, while studying medicine he made a theoretical thesis on the visual system under the tuition of neurosurgeon and neurophysiologist Fernando Rosas and the mathematician Carlo Federici at the National University of Colombia. He received his PhD in 1965 from the Australian National University working under Sir John Eccles.

== Personal life ==
By graduation in Australia, he was very interested in the biological basis of the mind. During this time he met his future wife who was studying philosophy. His two sons, Drs. Rafael and Alexander Llinas, are also physicians. His wife, Gillian Llinas (née Kimber) is an Australian philosopher of mind.

In 2006, he gave the inaugural address at the 2006 Albacete Multidisciplinary Campus on Perception and Intelligence, which celebrated the 50th anniversary of artificial intelligence, the so-called Dartmouth workshop.

Llinás was a scientific advisor during the establishment of an interactive science museum located in Bogotá, Colombia called Maloka Museum. In 2018, Llinás donated a T-Rex skeleton to the museum and helped to design a model of the nervous system for the dinosaur fossils. In 2024 he donated a professional-grade optical reflecting telescope to the historic Astronomical Observatory at the Universidad Nacional de Colombia.

== Work ==
He has studied the electrophysiology of single neurons in the cerebellum, the thalamus, the cerebral cortex, the entorhinal cortex, the hippocampus, the vestibular system, the inferior olive and the spinal cord. He has studied synaptic transmitter release in the squid giant synapse. He has studied human brain function using magnetoencephalography (MEG) on the basis of which he introduced the concept of Thalamocortical dysrhythmia.

In 2011, Llinás and neuropsychiatrist Sandlin Lowe further expanded this framework, publishing research on the imaging of thalamocortical dysrhythmias to map core pathologies and individualize treatment protocols in various neuropsychiatric conditions. Llinás has also explored the relationship between neural activity and consciousness, and has emphasized the brain's ability to combine individual experiences, or qualia, into a unified experience.

== Career ==
Llinás has occupied a number of positions.

- Research fellow, Massachusetts General Hosp.-Harvard University, 1960–61
- National Institutes of Health research fellow in physiology, University of Minnesota, Minneapolis, 1961–63
- Associate professor, University Minnesota, Minneapolis, 1965–66
- Associate member, American Medical Association Institute Biomed. Research, Chicago, 1966–68
- Member, American Medical Association Institute Biomed. Research, Chicago, 1970
- Head neurobiology unit, American Medical Association Institute Biomed. Research, Chicago, 1967–70
- Associate professor neurology and psychiatry, Northwestern University, 1967–71
- Guest professor physiology, Wayne State University, 1967–74
- Professorial lecturer pharmacology, University Ill.-Chgo., 1967–68
- Clinical professor, University Ill.-Chgo., 1968–72
- Professor physiology, head neurobiology div., University of Iowa, 1970–76
- Prof., chairman physiology and biophysics, New York University, New York City, 1976—2011
- Thomas and Suzanne Murphy professor neuroscience., New York University, 1985—
- University Professor, Department of Neuroscience and Physiology., New York University, 2011—

== Contributions ==
Llinás is known for his many contributions to neuroscience, however, his most important contributions are the following:

- Discovery of dendritic inhibition in central neurons (at the mammalian motoneuron).
- The functional organization of the cerebellar cortex neuronal circuits.
- Defining cerebellar function from an evolutionary perspective.
- First description of electrical coupling in the mammalian CNS (mesencephalic trigeminal nucleus).
- First determination of presynaptic calcium current, under voltage clamp, at the squid giant synapse.
- Discovery that vertebrate neurons (cerebellar Purkinje cell) can generate calcium-dependent spikes.
- Proposal and Organization of NASA Neurolab Project that flew on April 17, 1998, Space Shuttle Columbia.
- Discovery of the P-type calcium channel in the Purkinje cells.
- Discovery of low threshold spikes generated by low voltage activated calcium conductances (presently known as due to T-type calcium channel) in inferior olive and thalamus neurons.
- A tensor network model of the transformation of sensory space-time coordinates into motor coordinates by the cerebellum.
- Asserting the law of no interchangeability of neurons, which it is known as Llinás' law.
- Direct demonstration of calcium concentration microdomains at the presynaptic active zone.
- Utilization of magnetoencephalography in clinical research.
- Discovery of subthreshold membrane potential oscillations in the inferior olive, thalamus and entorhinal cortex.
- The discovery of Thalamocortical dysrhythmia.
- Artificial olivo-cerebellar motor control system as part of the project BAUV (Undersea Vehicle) of the US Navy developed by P. Bandyopadhyay.

== Memberships and honors ==
Llinás is a member of the United States National Academy of Sciences (1986), the American Academy of Arts and Sciences (1996), American Philosophical Society (1996), the Royal National Academy of Medicine (Spain) (1996) and the French Academy of Sciences (2002). Dr. Llinás has received honorary degrees from the following universities:

- Universidad de Salamanca (Spain) (1985)
- Universitat Autonoma de Barcelona (Spain) (1993)
- National University of Colombia (1994)
- Universidad Complutense, Madrid, Spain (1997)
- Los Andes University (Colombia), Bogotá, Colombia, (1998)
- Toyama University, Toyama, Japan (2005)
- University of Pavia, Pavia, Italy (2006)

Dr. Llinás has received the following awards:

- UNESCO Albert Einstein medal (1991)
- Order of Boyaca Awarded President of Colombia for exceptional service to Colombia (1992)
- Bernard Katz Award Biophysical Society, Washington USA (2012)
- Gold Medal of CSIC, Spanish National Research Council, Madrid, Spain (2012)
- Cajal Diploma given by Queen Sofia of Spain Madrid, Spain (2013)
- Ragnar Granit Lecture and Award, Nobel Institute, Stockholm, Sweden (2013)
- Castilla del Pino Lecture and Award Cordoba, Spain (2015)
- Nansen Neuroscience Lecture and award Norwegian Academy of Science, Oslo, Norway (2016)
- Scholar of the Year Australian National University, Canberra, Australia (2016)
- Ralph W. Gerard Prize in Neuroscience Society for Neuroscience, (2018)

He was the chairman of NASA/Neurolab Science Working Group, in 2011 received University Professor Distinction from New York University and in 2013, the NYU Neuroscience Institute created the Annual Rodolfo Llinás Lecture Series in recognition of his contributions to the field of neuroscience.

== Filmography ==
- Llinas, el cerebro y el universo. Documentary film, by Gonzalo Argandoña, Cabala Producción Audiovisual, (2018) RTVCplay.

== Selected bibliography ==
Llinás is the author of more than 20 book chapters and has edited several books on neuroscience.

=== Books ===
- Hubbard, J.I., Llinás, R. and Quastel, D.M.J. Electrophysiological Analysis of Synaptic Transmission. London: Edward Arnold Publishers 1969.
- Llinás, R. Editor. Neurobiology of Cerebellar Evolution and Development. (Chicago: Am. Med. Association, 1969)
- Precht, W., Llinás, R. (eds.): Frog Neurobiology: a handbook. (Berlin: Springer-Verlag, 1976). link.springer.com/10.1007/978-3-642-66316-1 ISBN 978-3-642-66318-5
- Steriade, M., Jones, E., y Llinás, R (Eds.): Thalamic Oscillations and Signaling. The Neurosciences Institute Publications Series. (John Wiley & Sons, 1990). ISBN 0-471-51508-6
- Llinás, R. y Sotelo, C (eds.): The Cerebellum Revisited. (Nueva York: Springer-Verlag, 1992). link.springer.com/10.1007/978-1-4612-2840-0 ISBN 978-1-4612-7691-3
- Buzsaki, G., Llinas, R., Singer, W., Berthoz, A., Christen, Y. (eds.): Temporal Coding in the Brain. (Nueva York: Springer-Verlag, 1994). link.springer.com/10.1007/978-3-642-85148-3 ISBN 978-3-642-85150-6
- Latorre, R., López-Barneo, J., Bezanilla, F., Llinás, R. (Eds) Biofísica y fisiología celular. (Universidad de Sevilla, España, 1996). ISBN 84-472-0339-5
- Llinás, Rodolfo R. and Churchland, Patricia S. Mind-Brain Continuum: Sensory Processes The MIT Press (September 9, 1996) ISBN 0-262-12198-0
- Llinás, Rodolfo R. The Squid Giant Synapse : A Model for Chemical Transmission Oxford University Press, USA (December 15, 1999) ISBN 0-19-511652-6
- Llinás, Rodolfo. El reto: Educación, Ciencia y Tecnología. Tercer Mundo Editores, (2000) ISBN 978-958-601-887-6
- Llinás, R. I of the vortex: from neurons to self (MIT Press, Cambridge, MA. 2001). ISBN 0-262-62163-0

=== Book chapters ===
- Llinas R, Rivary U. Perception as an oneiric-like state modulated by the senses. Chapter 6. In: Koch C. Large-scale neuronal theories of the brain. Bradford Book. (1994). ISBN 9780262111836
- Llinas RR., Walton KD. Cerebellum. Chapter 7. In: Shepherd GM. The synaptic organization of the brain. 4th Ed. New York: Oxford University Press. (1998) ISBN 0195118243
- Llinas RR., Walton KD., Lang EJ. Cerebellum. Chapter 7. In: Shepherd GM. The synaptic organization of the brain. 5th Ed. Oxford University Press. (2004) ISBN 0195159551
- Llinas, R. R. Neuroscientific basis of consciousness and dreaming. Chapter 3.6. In: Kaplan and Sadock's Comprehensive textbook of psychiatry. Philadelphia: Lippincott Williams & Wilkins. 8th ed. (2005).
- Llinás, R. Electrophysiology of the Cerebellar Networks. Comprehensive Physiology (2011). Supplement 2. Handbook of Physiology, The Nervous System, Motor Control. doi:10.1002/cphy.cp010217 ISBN 9780470650714
- Llinas RR., Walton K. Central pain: a thalamic deafferentation generating thalamocortical dysrhythmia. Chapter 4. In: Saab CY. Chronic pain and brain abnormalities. Academic Press-Elsevier (2014). ISBN 9780123983893
- Llinas, RR. Oscillation in the inferior olive neurons: Functional implication. Chapter 39. pp. 293–298. In: Essentials of Cerebellum and Cerebellar Disorders: A Primer for Graduate Students. Springer (2016) ISBN 978-3-319-24551-5
- Llinas, R. R. Consciousness and Dreaming from a Pathophysiological Perspective: The Thalamocortical Dysrhythmia Syndrome. Chapter 3.5. In: Kaplan and Sadock's Comprehensive textbook of psychiatry. Philadelphia: Lippincott Williams & Wilkins. 10th ed. (2017). ISBN 978-1-4511-0047-1

=== Selected review articles ===
- Llinás RR (December 1988). "The intrinsic electrophysiological properties of mammalian neurons: insights into central nervous system function". Science. 242 (4886): 1654–64. Bibcode:1988Sci...242.1654L. doi:10.1126/science.3059497. PMID 3059497.
- Llinás RR, Sugimori M, Cherksey B (1989). "Voltage-dependent calcium conductance in mammalian neurons. The P channel". Ann N Y Acad Sci. 560: 103–11. doi:10.1111/j.1749-6632.1989.tb24084.x. PMID 2545128. S2CID 84107834.
- Llinás RR (1991). "Depolarization release coupling: an overview". Ann N Y Acad Sci. 635 (1): 3–17. Bibcode:1991NYASA.635....3L. doi:10.1111/j.1749-6632.1991.tb36476.x. PMID 1660239. S2CID 30849546.
- Llinás RR, Paré D (1991). "Of dreaming and wakefulness". Neuroscience. 44 (3): 521–35. doi:10.1016/0306-4522(91)90075-y. PMID 1754050. S2CID 32125577.
- Llinás R, Ribary U (Apr 2001). "Consciousness and the brain. The thalamocortical dialogue in health and disease". Ann N Y Acad Sci. 929: 166–75. doi:10.1111/j.1749-6632.2001.tb05715.x. PMID 11349424. S2CID 146564098.
- Llinás Rodolfo R., Steriade Mircea (2006). "Bursting of thalamic neurons and states of vigilance. Invited Review". J. Neurophysiol. 95 (6): 3297–3308. doi:10.1152/jn.00166.2006. PMID 16554502.
- Roy S, Llinás R (2007). "Dynamic geometry, brain function modeling, and consciousness". Models of Brain and Mind - Physical, Computational and Psychological Approaches. Progress in Brain Research. Vol. 168. pp. 133–44. doi:10.1016/S0079-6123(07)68011-X. ISBN 9780444530509. PMID 18166391.
- Llinás RR (2011). "Cerebellar motor learning versus cerebellar motor timing: the climbing fibre story". J Physiol. 589 (14): 3423–32. doi:10.1113/jphysiol.2011.207464. PMC 3167107. PMID 21486816.
- Buzsáki G, Llinás R (2017). "Space and time in the brain". Science. 358 (6362): 482–485. Bibcode:2017Sci...358..482B. doi:10.1126/science.aan8869. PMC 5998813. PMID 29074768.
