= EDM =

EDM or E-DM may refer to:

== Music ==
- Electronic dance music
- Early Day Miners, American band

== Science and technology ==
- Electric dipole moment
- Electrical discharge machining
- Electronic distance measurement
- Entry, descent, and landing demonstrator module, like the Schiaparelli EDM
  - See also: Entry, descent and landing (EDL)
- Encyclopedic Dictionary of Mathematics
- permanent electric dipole moment

=== Computing ===
- Educational data mining
- Electronic document management
- Empirical dynamic modeling
- Enterprise data management
- Enterprise data modeling
- Enterprise decision management
- Entity Data Model
- Euclidean distance matrix
- Experiment-directed metadynamics

== Places ==
- Edmonton, Alberta, Canada
- Edmonds station, Edmonds, Washington, United States
- Edward-Dean Museum & Gardens, Cherry Valley, California, United States

== Politics ==
- Early day motion

== Other uses ==
- Electronic direct mail. See Email marketing.
- Department of Essential Drugs and Medicines of the World Health Organization
- Event-driven marketing
- Master of Education (Ed.M.)
- Electricidade de Moçambique, energy company of Mozambique
- Einsatzstaffel der Deutschen Mannschaft, Croatian collaborationist military unit
