= Smooth vector =

Smooth vector may refer to:

- Smooth vector for a strongly continuous group action; see group action
- Smooth vector field on a differentiable manifold; see tangent space
