= Tensor network theory =

Theory of brain function

Tensor network theory is a theory of brain function (particularly that of the cerebellum) that provides a mathematical model of the transformation of sensory space-time coordinates into motor coordinates and vice versa by cerebellar neuronal networks. The theory was developed by Andras Pellionisz and Rodolfo Llinas in the 1980s as a geometrization of brain function (especially of the central nervous system) using tensors.

Metric tensor that transforms input covariant tensors into output contravariant tensors. These tensors can be used to mathematically describe cerebellar neuronal network activities in the central nervous system.

== History ==
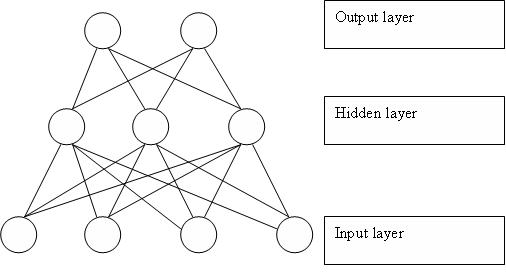
Neuronal network schematic. The sensory inputs get transformed by the hidden layer representing the central nervous system which in turn outputs a motor response.

=== Geometrization movement of the mid-20th century ===
The mid-20th century saw a concerted movement to quantify and provide geometric models for various fields of science, including biology and physics. The geometrization of biology began in the 1950s in an effort to reduce concepts and principles of biology down into concepts of geometry similar to what was done in physics in the decades before. In fact, much of the geometrization that took place in the field of biology took its cues from the geometrization of contemporary physics. One major achievement in general relativity was the geometrization of gravitation. This allowed the trajectories of objects to be modeled as geodesic curves (or optimal paths) in a Riemannian space manifold. During the 1980s, the field of theoretical physics also witnessed an outburst of geometrization activity in parallel with the development of the Unified Field Theory, the Theory of Everything, and the similar Grand Unified Theory, all of which attempted to explain connections between known physical phenomena.

The geometrization of biology in parallel with the geometrization of physics covered a multitude of fields, including populations, disease outbreaks, and evolution, and continues to be an active field of research even today. By developing geometric models of populations and disease outbreaks, it is possible to predict the extent of the epidemic and allow public health officials and medical professionals to control disease outbreaks and better prepare for future epidemics. Likewise, there is work being done to develop geometric models for the evolutionary process of species in order to study the process of evolution, the space of morphological properties, the diversity of forms and spontaneous changes and mutations.

=== Geometrization of the brain and tensor network theory ===
Around the same time as all of the developments in the geometrization of biology and physics, some headway was made in the geometrization of neuroscience. At the time, it became more and more necessary for brain functions to be quantified in order to study them more rigorously. Much of the progress can be attributed to the work of Pellionisz and Llinas and their associates who developed the tensor network theory in order to give researchers a means to quantify and model central nervous system activities.

In 1980, Pellionisz and Llinas introduced their tensor network theory to describe the behavior of the cerebellum in transforming afferent sensory inputs into efferent motor outputs. They proposed that intrinsic multidimensional central nervous system space could be described and modeled by an extrinsic network of tensors that together describe the behavior of the central nervous system. By treating the brain as a "geometrical object" and assuming that (1) neuronal network activity is vectorial and (2) that the networks themselves are organized tensorially, brain function could be quantified and described simply as a network of tensors.

- Sensory input = covariant tensor
- Motor output = contravariant tensor
- Cerebellar neuronal network = metric tensor that transforms the sensory input into the motor output

== Example ==
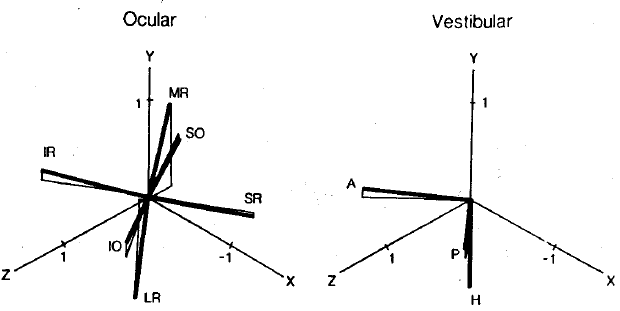
Six rotational axes about which the extraocular muscles turn the eye and the three rotational axes about which the vestibular semicircular canals measure head-movement. According to tensor network theory, a metric tensor can be determined to connect the two coordinate systems.

=== Vestibulo-ocular reflex ===
In 1986, Pellionisz described the geometrization of the "three-neuron vestibulo-ocular reflex arc" in a cat using tensor network theory. The "three-neuron vestibulo-ocular reflex arc" is named for the three neuron circuit the arc comprises. Sensory input into the vestibular system (angular acceleration of the head) is first received by the primary vestibular neurons which subsequently synapse onto secondary vestibular neurons. These secondary neurons carry out much of the signal processing and produce the efferent signal heading for the oculomotor neurons. Prior to the publishing of this paper, there had been no quantitative model to describe this "classic example of a basic sensorimotor transformation in the central nervous system" which is precisely what tensor network theory had been developed to model.

Here, Pellionisz described the analysis of the sensory input into the vestibular canals as the covariant vector component of tensor network theory. Likewise, the synthesized motor response (reflexive eye movement) is described as the contravariant vector component of the theory. By calculating the neuronal network transformations between the sensory input into the vestibular system and the subsequent motor response, a metric tensor representing the neuronal network was calculated.

The resulting metric tensor allowed for accurate predictions of the neuronal connections between the three intrinsically orthogonal vestibular canals and the six extraocular muscles that control the movement of the eye.

== Applications ==
=== Neural Networks and Artificial Intelligence ===
Neural networks modeled after the activities of the central nervous system have allowed researchers to solve problems impossible to solve by other means. Artificial neural networks are now being applied in various applications to further research in other fields. One notable non-biological application of the tensor network theory was the simulated automated landing of a damaged F-15 fighter jet on one wing using a "Transputer parallel computer neural network". The fighter jet's sensors fed information into the flight computer which in turn transformed that information into commands to control the plane's wing-flaps and ailerons to achieve a stable touchdown. This was synonymous to sensory inputs from the body being transformed into motor outputs by the cerebellum. The flight computer's calculations and behavior was modeled as a metric tensor taking the covariant sensor readings and transforming it into contravariant commands to control aircraft hardware.
