= George Sugihara =

American mathematical biologist

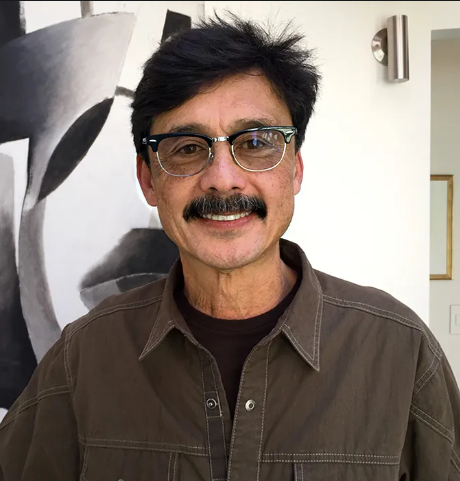
- Sugihara in 2015
- Born: Tokyo
- Education: Princeton University
- Known for: Empirical dynamic modeling
- Scientific career
- Fields: Algebraic topology, network theory, nonlinear dynamics, chaotic systems, causality, ecology, medicine, genomics, finance, atmospheric and earth science, fisheries
- Workplaces: Scripps Institution of Oceanography, University of California San Diego; Cornell University; Imperial College London; Kyoto University; Tokyo Institute of Technology; Oxford University
- Doctoral advisor: Robert May
- Doctoral students: Alistair Hobday, Chi-Hao Hsieh, Charles Perretti, Hao Ye, Ethan Deyle, Alfredo Giron-Nava
- Other notable students: DJ Patil, Louis-Felix Bersier, Martin Casdagli, Franc Courchamp
- Website: https://deepeco.ucsd.edu/

George Sugihara is a professor of biological oceanography and complex systems at the Scripps Institution of Oceanography where he is the inaugural holder of the McQuown Chair in Natural Science.

His work involves inductive theoretical approaches to understanding nature from observational data. The general approach is different from most theory and involves minimalist inductive theory – Inductive data-driven explorations of nature using minimal assumptions. The aim is to avoid inevitable assumptions of deductive first-principle models and produce an understanding that passes the validation test of out-of-sample prediction. His initial work on fisheries as complex, chaotic systems led to work on financial networks and prediction of chaotic systems.

== Research interests ==
Research interests include complexity theory, nonlinear dynamics, ecology, cryptic pathology, food web structure, species abundance patterns, conservation biology, biological control, neuroscience, epidemiology, geoscience, empirical climate modelling, quantitative finance, economics, fisheries forecasting, and the design and implementation of derivatives markets for fisheries.

== Education ==
Sugihara studied natural resources at the University of Michigan, where he received a BS in 1973. At Princeton University he studied mathematical ecology under Robert May earning a MS in biology in 1980 and PhD in mathematical biology in 1983.

While at Princeton he made important contributions to species abundance by identifying regularities in hierarchical community structure expressed by sequentially divided niches. The hierarchical structure, representing a minimal form of community structure, derives from evolutionary and ecological drivers generating species diversity accounting for observed abundance structures.

== Career ==
Sugihara began his career as the Wigner Prize Fellow at Oak Ridge National Laboratory and concurrently associate professor of Mathematics at the University of Tennessee. A notable contribution was the topological / graph theoretical proof that increasing food web species specialization combined with the rigid circuit property leads to the rule that species enter communities by attaching within individual guilds or cliques rather than across multiple guilds.

In 1986, he joined Scripps Institution of Oceanography (SIO), holding the UC San Diego John Dove Isaacs Chair in Natural Philosophy from 1990 to 1995. Since 2007 he has been the McQuown Professor of Natural Science at Scripps.

Sugihara has been a visiting professor at Cornell University, Imperial College London, Kyoto University and the Tokyo Institute of Technology, and was a visiting fellow at Merton College, Oxford University in 2002. He served as a member of the National Academy of Sciences Board on Mathematical Sciences and its Applications.

=== Contributions ===
Early work included topology and assembly in ecological and social systems and generic early warning signs of critical transitions that apply across many apparently different classes of systems.

One of his most interdisciplinary contributions involves the work he developed with Robert May concerning methods for forecasting nonlinear and chaotic systems. This took him into the arena of investment banking at Deutsche Bank, where he applied these theoretical methods to forecast erratic market behavior.

He helped found Prediction Company and Quantitative Advisors LLC, and has been a consultant to the Bank of England, the Federal Reserve Bank of New York, and to the Federal Reserve System on questions of international security regarding systemic risk in the financial sector.

He also contributed significantly to natural resource management and policy development. He was commissioned by the Eastern Bering Sea and Aleutian Islands Alaskan Pollock Fleet, one of the most valuable fisheries in the world to design a market-incentive plan, the Comprehensive Incentive Plan (CIP), for salmon by-catch avoidance. He developed the plan framework implemented in 2010 to protect the native salmon fisheries of western Alaska, resulting in a marked decrease in salmon bycatch.

Other contributions address topology and assembly of ecological systems, and, social system dynamics, as well as work on generic early warning signs of critical transitions across many apparently different classes of systems.

==== Empirical Dynamic Modeling ====
Focusing on data-driven, practical solutions to analysis and forecasting he developed empirical dynamic modeling, a set of tools and techniques widely applicable to analysis and prediction of complex, nonlinear systems. A particularly important and widely-used tool is convergent cross mapping, a method to quantify cause-and-effect relationships as expressed in the underlying dynamics of the data rather than on statistical estimates such as a correlation coefficient that may not be justifiable or informative on nonlinear (state-dependent) complex systems.
