= Coordinate-induced basis =

In mathematics, a coordinate-induced basis is a basis for the tangent space or cotangent space of a manifold that is induced by a certain coordinate system. Given the coordinate system $x^a$, the coordinate-induced basis $e_a$ of the tangent space is given by

$$e_a = \frac{\partial}{\partial x^a}$$

and the dual basis $\omega^a$ of the cotangent space is

$$\omega^a=dx^a. \,$$
