= Low-threshold spikes =

Low-threshold spikes (LTS) refer to membrane depolarizations by the T-type calcium channel. LTS occur at low, negative, membrane depolarizations. They often follow a membrane hyperpolarization, which can be the result of decreased excitability or increased inhibition. LTS result in the neuron reaching the threshold for an action potential. LTS is a large depolarization due to an increase in Ca^{2+} conductance, so LTS is mediated by calcium (Ca^{2+}) conductance. The spike is typically crowned by a burst of two to seven action potentials, which is known as a low-threshold burst. LTS are voltage dependent and are inactivated if the cell's resting membrane potential is more depolarized than −60mV. LTS are deinactivated, or recover from inactivation, if the cell is hyperpolarized and can be activated by depolarizing inputs, such as excitatory postsynaptic potentials (EPSP). LTS were discovered by Rodolfo Llinás and coworkers in the 1980s.

== Physiology ==
=== Rhythmicity ===
Rhythmogenesis in a neuron is due to an instability associated with the resting potential. Such instability can be attributed to properties of low-threshold calcium currents. The current is activated at around −60 mV, making it able to generate a low-threshold spike at or near the resting potential.

In a somewhat recent finding, cells maintained at a hyperpolarized level have been shown to exhibit intrinsic rhythmicity, resulting in spontaneous oscillatory behavior due to Ca^{2+} driven depolarizations. As a result, one or more short bursts of spikes occur, followed by hyperpolarization, and then repolarization before the next burst.

=== LTS kinetics ===
A study done by Gutierrez et al. examined the kinetics behind low-threshold spikes to better understand their significance towards normal functions of the brain. It has been determined experimentally that four ionic currents contribute to low-threshold spikes, generating three distinct phases after hyperpolarization. Transient outward K+ currents following action potentials can cause hyperpolarization, allowing for low-threshold spikes. An initial ohmic leakage current composed of K+ and Na+ ions characterizes the first phase. This is followed by a hyperpolarization-activated "sag" current that contributes to slowly depolarizing the membrane potential. An inward Ca^{2+} current through T-type calcium channels is the last phase, and the main current responsible for the large transient depolarization. This overrides the other currents once T-type channels are activated. The other currents primarily affect the activation of the LTS.

=== T-type calcium channel ===
The T-type calcium channel is found in neurons throughout the brain. These channels produce particularly large currents in thalamic, septal, and sensory neurons. Due to their activation near the resting membrane potential, as well as their fast recovery from inactivation, they are able to generate low-threshold spikes, which results in a burst of action potentials.

T-type channels play a secondary pacemaker role in neurons that have resting membrane potential between -90 and -70 mV as they have an important role in the genesis of burst firing. An excitatory postsynaptic potential (EPSP) opens the channels, thus generating a LTS. The LTS triggers Na^{+}-dependent action potentials and activates high-voltage activated calcium channels.

=== Low-threshold spikes generate burst firing ===
Evidence for low-threshold calcium current was first described in neurons of the inferior olivary nucleus (1981). This nucleus generates synchronous rhythmic activity, which under certain conditions is manifested as a tremor. Low-threshold calcium spikes have been described in neurons from a variety of brain nuclei, including the thalamic relay, medial pontine reticular formation, lateral habenula, septum, deep cerebellar nuclei, CA1-CA3 of the hippocampus, association cortex, paraventricular and preoptic nuclei of the hypothalamus, dorsal raphe, globus pallidus, striatum, and subthalamic nucleus.

Thalamic relay cells show two types of responses. One response mode is a relay or tonic mode, in which the cell is depolarized and LTS are inactivated. This leads to tonic firing of action potentials. The second response is a burst mode, in which the cell is hyperpolarized and typically responds with LTS and their associated bursts of action potentials.

In general, LTS cannot be triggered by depolarization of the neuron from the resting membrane potential. LTS is observed after a hyperpolarizing pulse is delivered to the neuronal cell, which is called "deinactivation" and is a result of channels recovering from inactivation.

LTS are often triggered after an inhibitory postsynaptic potential (IPSP) due to the fast recovery of T-type calcium channels during the IPSP and their opening, as there is a return to resting membrane potential.

There is a strong correlation between LTS amplitude and the number of action potentials that result from a LTS. There is much more depolarization of T channels near the dendritic location of activated receptors than at the soma. The activation of either metabotropic glutamate or muscarinic receptors results in a hyperpolarizing shift in the relationship between LTS amplitude and the initial potential of the membrane. This affects the maximum LTS amplitude. This means that there is a dependency between the LTS amplitude and voltage, and therefore the resulting number of action potentials generated.

=== LTS is mediated by a Ca^{2+} conductance ===
When the hyperpolarization of the membrane in these interneurons is maintained at a certain level calcium conductance is reduced, if not completely inactivated. This results in the membrane polarization not being in the right range for single spikes and hence "bursts" result. The LTS therefore is dependent upon the conductance of calcium.

=== Serotonin inhibition of the low-threshold spike ===
The striatum, a nucleus in the basal ganglia, contains low-threshold spike interneurons. The basal ganglia serve many functions, which include involuntary motor control, emotions, and cognition. These interneurons produce nitric oxide and are modulated by neurotransmitters, specifically serotonin, released from the brainstem. Serotonin serves to inhibit these interneurons. This was studied using transgenic mice in which nitric oxide interneurons were labeled green using green fluorescent protein (GFP). Serotonin binds to serotonin receptors on the interneuron (5-HT2c), which increases potassium conductance and subsequently decreases the excitability of the neuron.

== Research ==
Much of the research done on LTS has examined cells of a cat’s lateral geniculate nucleus. All thalamic relay cells experience these specific voltage-dependent calcium currents, and the cat has proven to be a useful model species to study. Different variations of current clamp methods, in addition to model simulations have shed light on many aspects of the phenomena.

Recent research has also been conducted on the T-type calcium channel and how modulation of these channels may allow for the treatment of various neurological and psychological disorders such as schizophrenia, dementia, mania, and epilepsy. This is, however, still a new area of research. T-type calcium channels have been known to play a role in the spike-and-wave discharges of absence seizures. Antiepileptic drugs can control absence seizures by inhibiting the T-type calcium channels which prevents low-voltage calcium currents.

=== Amplitude of the Ca^{2+} spike ===
The amplitude of LTS has been shown to directly correlate with the size of the transient Ca^{2+} current that underlies the LTS in certain neuronal cells. They are triggered by a combination of a hyperpolarized membrane, or de-inactivation of Ca^{2+} channels, and a suprathreshold depolarizing input. The amplitude of the Ca^{2+} spike is therefore predominantly dependent on the level of preceding membrane hyperpolarization and the depolarizing input.

However, it has been demonstrated that the LTS are all-or-none events due to the regenerative nature of the phenomenon. As with the action potentials that follow them, LTS vary little in amplitude or shape at different holding potentials. This dictates that suprathreshold depolarizing inputs do not affect the amplitude and only factor into the initial activation of the LTS. The amount of de-inactivation determines the conductance of Ca^{2+} channels and is the main factor that contributes to the amplitude of LTS. It has also been suggested that the activity of delayed rectifier K+ channels can affect the amplitude of LTS. Burst firing caused by LTS are therefore thought to be used as on/off signaling as opposed to tonic firing which is graded and more responsive to the intensity of depolarizing inputs.

=== Latency of the Ca^{2+} spike ===
The latency of a LTS is the amount of time between the depolarizing pulse and its peak. It has been shown that unlike amplitude, it is directly affected by the size of the initial depolarizing current. This is derived from the interaction between the initial, outward ohmic response, which is the leakage K+ ions out of the cell in response to change in membrane potential, and the voltage-dependent gating of the T-type calcium channels.

Latency is decreased with an increased depolarizing current, which overruns the outward ohmic current and more quickly depolarizes the membrane. This more quickly activates the exponential growth of the Ca^{2+} spike. This reduction occurs more sharply with depolarizing currents closer to the threshold and more gradually as current injections are increased beyond threshold. Latency cannot be further reduced beyond a certain depolarizing current and becomes nearly uniform with any larger current. This has led to the hypothesis that burst signaling as a result of LTS with stronger activating inputs is more stable than LTS due to near-threshold activating inputs.

=== Parkinson's disease ===
The thalamus is responsible for relaying sensory and motor signals to the cerebral cortex. Therefore, much research has been conducted on low-threshold spikes in the neurons in the thalamus and how it could relate to Parkinson's disease and the corresponding loss of motor function. Hypo-bradykinesia, as seen in Parkinson's disease, is improved by medial thalamotomy; this suggests that it is caused by interference of thalamic LTS bursts with cortical functions.

LTS have been found to occur in the human lateral thalamus during sleep; however, they fade as soon as the patient is awakened. Abnormal LTS bursting activities that have been noted in awake parkinsonian patients suggests a relation between the clinical condition and this neuronal activity.
