= Tangent space to a functor =

Concept in category theory

In algebraic geometry, the tangent space to a functor generalizes the classical construction of a tangent space such as the Zariski tangent space. The construction is based on the following observation. Let X be a scheme over a field k.

To give a $k[\epsilon]/(\epsilon)^2$-point of X is the same thing as to give a k-rational point p of X (i.e., the residue field of p is k) together with an element of $(\mathfrak{m}_{X, p}/\mathfrak{m}_{X, p}^2)^*$; i.e., a tangent vector at p.

(To see this, use the fact that any local homomorphism $\mathcal{O}_p \to k[\epsilon]/(\epsilon)^2$ must be of the form

$\delta_p^v: u \mapsto u(p) + \epsilon v(u), \quad v \in \mathcal{O}_p^*.$)

Let F be a functor from the category of k-algebras to the category of sets. Then, for any k-point $p \in F(k)$, the fiber of $\pi: F(k[\epsilon]/(\epsilon)^2) \to F(k)$ over p is called the tangent space to F at p. If the functor F preserves fibered products (e.g. if it is a scheme), the tangent space may be given the structure of a vector space over k. If F is a scheme X over k (i.e., $F = \operatorname{Hom}_{\operatorname{Spec}k}(\operatorname{Spec}-, X)$), then each v as above may be identified with a derivation at p and this gives the identification of $\pi^{-1}(p)$ with the space of derivations at p and we recover the usual construction.

The construction may be thought of as defining an analog of the tangent bundle in the following way. Let $T_X = X(k[\epsilon]/(\epsilon)^2)$. Then, for any morphism $f: X \to Y$ of schemes over k, one sees $f^{\#}(\delta_p^v) = \delta_{f(p)}^{df_p(v)}$; this shows that the map $T_X \to T_Y$ that f induces is precisely the differential of f under the above identification.
