= Mixed tensor =

Tensor having both covariant and contravariant indices

In tensor analysis, a mixed tensor is a tensor which is neither strictly covariant nor strictly contravariant; at least one of the indices of a mixed tensor will be a subscript (covariant) and at least one of the indices will be a superscript (contravariant).

A mixed tensor of type or valence $\binom{M}{N}$, also written "type (M, N)", with both M > 0 and N > 0, is a tensor which has M contravariant indices and N covariant indices. Such a tensor can be defined as a linear function which maps an (M + N)-tuple of M one-forms and N vectors to a scalar.

== Changing the tensor type ==
Consider the following octet of related tensors: $T_{\alpha \beta \gamma}, \ T_{\alpha \beta} {}^\gamma, \ T_\alpha {}^\beta {}_\gamma, \ T_\alpha {}^{\beta \gamma}, \ T^\alpha {}_{\beta \gamma}, \ T^\alpha {}_\beta {}^\gamma, \ T^{\alpha \beta} {}_\gamma, \ T^{\alpha \beta \gamma} .$ The first one is covariant, the last one contravariant, and the remaining ones mixed. Notationally, these tensors differ from each other by the covariance/contravariance of their indices. A given contravariant index of a tensor can be lowered using the metric tensor g_{μν}, and a given covariant index can be raised using the inverse metric tensor g^{μν}. Thus, g_{μν} could be called the index lowering operator and g^{μν} the index raising operator.

Generally, the covariant metric tensor, contracted with a tensor of type (M, N), yields a tensor of type (M − 1, N + 1), whereas its contravariant inverse, contracted with a tensor of type (M, N), yields a tensor of type (M + 1, N − 1).

=== Examples ===
As an example, a mixed tensor of type (1, 2) can be obtained by raising an index of a covariant tensor of type (0, 3), $T_{\alpha \beta} {}^\lambda = T_{\alpha \beta \gamma} \, g^{\gamma \lambda} ,$ where $T_{\alpha \beta} {}^\lambda$ is the same tensor as $T_{\alpha \beta} {}^\gamma$, because $T_{\alpha \beta} {}^\lambda \, \delta_\lambda {}^\gamma = T_{\alpha \beta} {}^\gamma,$ with Kronecker δ acting here like an identity matrix.

Likewise, $T_\alpha {}^\lambda {}_\gamma = T_{\alpha \beta \gamma} \, g^{\beta \lambda},$ $T_\alpha {}^{\lambda \epsilon} = T_{\alpha \beta \gamma} \, g^{\beta \lambda} \, g^{\gamma \epsilon},$ $T^{\alpha \beta} {}_\gamma = g_{\gamma \lambda} \, T^{\alpha \beta \lambda},$ $T^\alpha {}_{\lambda \epsilon} = g_{\lambda \beta} \, g_{\epsilon \gamma} \, T^{\alpha \beta \gamma}.$

Raising an index of the metric tensor is equivalent to contracting it with its inverse, yielding the Kronecker delta, $g^{\mu \lambda} \, g_{\lambda \nu} = g^\mu {}_\nu = \delta^\mu {}_\nu ,$ so any mixed version of the metric tensor will be equal to the Kronecker delta, which will also be mixed.

== See also ==
- Covariance and contravariance of vectors
- Einstein notation
- Ricci calculus
- Tensor (intrinsic definition)
- Two-point tensor
