= I of the Vortex =

Book by Rodolfo Llinás

I of the Vortex: From Neurons to Self is a popular science book by the Colombian neuroscientist Rodolfo Llinás, published in February 2002 by MIT Press. and whose Spanish edition features a prologue by his friend, Nobel laureate Gabriel García Márquez.

The book is considered a best seller for scientific dissemination and won the "best health book" award at the International Latino Book Award Fair in BookExpo America 2013, in New York, and according to Google Scholar has received more than 1000 citations.

== Content ==
The book traces the history of neuroscience in its search for trying to explain the functioning of the mind and the brain. In addition, the author includes some of his ideas and research, published in international research journals, but prepared for a general public.

== See also ==
- Human evolution
- Neuroscience
