= Zariski tangent space =

Tangent spaces in algebraic geometry

In algebraic geometry, the Zariski tangent space is a construction that defines a tangent space at a point P on an algebraic variety V (and more generally). It does not use differential calculus, being based directly on abstract algebra, and in the most concrete cases just the theory of a system of linear equations.

== Motivation ==
For example, suppose C is a plane curve defined by a polynomial equation

F(X,Y) = 0

and take P to be the origin (0,0). Erasing terms of higher order than 1 would produce a 'linearised' equation reading

L(X,Y) = 0

in which all terms X^{a}Y^{b} have been discarded if a + b > 1.

We have two cases: L may be 0, or it may be the equation of a line. In the first case the (Zariski) tangent space to C at (0,0) is the whole plane, considered as a two-dimensional affine space. In the second case, the tangent space is that line, considered as affine space. (The question of the origin comes up, when we take P as a general point on C; it is better to say 'affine space' and then note that P is a natural origin, rather than insist directly that it is a vector space.)

It is easy to see that over the real field we can obtain L in terms of the first partial derivatives of F. When those both are 0 at P, we have a singular point (double point, cusp or something more complicated). The general definition is that singular points of C are the cases when the tangent space has dimension 2.

== Definition ==
The cotangent space of a local ring R, with maximal ideal $\mathfrak{m}$ is defined to be

$$\mathfrak{m}/\mathfrak{m}^2$$

where $\mathfrak{m}$^{2} is given by the product of ideals. It is a vector space over the residue field k:= R/$\mathfrak{m}$. Its dual (as a k-vector space) is called tangent space of R.

This definition is a generalization of the above example to higher dimensions: suppose given an affine algebraic variety V and a point v of V. Morally, modding out $\mathfrak{m}$^{2} corresponds to dropping the non-linear terms from the equations defining V inside some affine space, therefore giving a system of linear equations that define the tangent space.

The tangent space $T_P(X)$ and cotangent space $T_P^*(X)$ to a scheme X at a point P is the (co)tangent space of $\mathcal{O}_{X,P}$. Due to the functoriality of Spec, the natural quotient map $f:R\rightarrow R/I$ induces a homomorphism $g:\mathcal{O}_{X,f^{-1}(P)}\rightarrow \mathcal{O}_{Y,P}$ for X=Spec(R), P a point in Y=Spec(R/I). This is used to embed $T_P(Y)$ in $T_{f^{-1}P}(X)$. Since morphisms of fields are injective, the surjection of the residue fields induced by g is an isomorphism. Then a morphism k of the cotangent spaces is induced by g, given by

$$\mathfrak{m}_P/\mathfrak{m}_P^2$$
$$\cong (\mathfrak{m}_{f^{-1}P}/I)/((\mathfrak{m}_{f^{-1}P}^2+I)/I)$$
$$\cong \mathfrak{m}_{f^{-1}P}/(\mathfrak{m}_{f^{-1}P}^2+I)$$
$$\cong (\mathfrak{m}_{f^{-1}P}/\mathfrak{m}_{f^{-1}P}^2)/\mathrm{Ker}(k).$$

Since this is a surjection, the transpose $k^*:T_P(Y) \rarr T_{f^{-1}P}(X)$ is an injection.

(One often defines the tangent and cotangent spaces for a manifold in the analogous manner.)

== Analytic functions ==
If V is a subvariety of an n-dimensional vector space, defined by an ideal I, then R = F_{n} / I, where F_{n} is the ring of smooth/analytic/holomorphic functions on this vector space. The Zariski tangent space at x is

m_{n} / (I+m_{n}^{2}),

where m_{n} is the maximal ideal consisting of those functions in F_{n} vanishing at x.

In the planar example above, I = (F(X,Y)), and I+m^{2} = (L(X,Y))+m^{2}.

== Properties ==
If R is a Noetherian local ring, the dimension of the tangent space is at least the dimension of R:

$$\dim{\mathfrak{m}/\mathfrak{m}^2 \geq \dim{R}}$$

R is called regular if equality holds. In a more geometric parlance, when R is the local ring of a variety V at a point v, one also says that v is a regular point. Otherwise it is called a singular point.

The tangent space has an interpretation in terms of K[t]/(t^{2}), the dual numbers for K; in the parlance of schemes, morphisms from Spec K[t]/(t^{2}) to a scheme X over K correspond to a choice of a rational point x ∈ X(k) and an element of the tangent space at x. Therefore, one also talks about tangent vectors. See also: tangent space to a functor.

In general, the dimension of the Zariski tangent space can be extremely large. For example, let $C^1(\mathbf{R})$ be the ring of continuously differentiable real-valued functions on $\mathbf{R}$. Define $R = C_0^1(\mathbf{R})$ to be the ring of germs of such functions at the origin. Then R is a local ring, and its maximal ideal m consists of all germs which vanish at the origin. The functions $x^\alpha$ for $\alpha \in (1, 2)$ define linearly independent vectors in the Zariski cotangent space $\mathfrak{m}/\mathfrak{m}^2$, so the dimension of $\mathfrak{m}/\mathfrak{m}^2$ is at least the $\mathfrak{c}$, the cardinality of the continuum. The dimension of the Zariski tangent space $(\mathfrak{m}/\mathfrak{m}^2)^*$ is therefore at least $2^\mathfrak{c}$. On the other hand, the ring of germs of smooth functions at a point in an n-manifold has an n-dimensional Zariski cotangent space. (Note: https://mathoverflow.net/questions/44705/cardinalities-larger-than-the-continuum-in-areas-besides-set-theory/44733#44733)

== See also ==
- Tangent cone
- Jet (mathematics)

== Sources ==
- Eisenbud, David; Harris, Joe (1998). The Geometry of Schemes. Springer-Verlag. ISBN 0-387-98637-5 – via Internet Archive.
- Hartshorne, Robin (1977). Algebraic Geometry. Graduate Texts in Mathematics. Vol. 52. New York: Springer-Verlag. ISBN 978-0-387-90244-9. MR 0463157.
- Zariski, Oscar (1947). "The concept of a simple point of an abstract algebraic variety". Transactions of the American Mathematical Society. 62: 1–52. doi:10.1090/S0002-9947-1947-0021694-1. MR 0021694. Zbl 0031.26101.
