= Two-point tensor =

Two-point tensors, or double vectors, are tensor-like quantities which transform as Euclidean vectors with respect to each of their indices. They are used in continuum mechanics to transform between reference ("material") and present ("configuration") coordinates. Examples include the deformation gradient and the first Piola–Kirchhoff stress tensor.

As with many applications of tensors, Einstein summation notation is frequently used. To clarify this notation, capital indices are often used to indicate reference coordinates and lowercase for present coordinates. Thus, a two-point tensor will have one capital and one lower-case index; for example, A_{jM}.

== Continuum mechanics ==
A conventional tensor can be viewed as a transformation of vectors in one coordinate system to other vectors in the same coordinate system. In contrast, a two-point tensor transforms vectors from one coordinate system to another. That is, a conventional tensor,

$$\mathbf{Q} = Q_{pq}(\mathbf{e}_p\otimes \mathbf{e}_q)$$,

actively transforms a vector u to a vector v such that

$$\mathbf{v}=\mathbf{Q}\mathbf{u}$$

where v and u are measured in the same space and their coordinates representation is with respect to the same basis (denoted by the "e").

In contrast, a two-point tensor, G will be written as

$$\mathbf{G} = G_{pq}(\mathbf{e}_p\otimes \mathbf{E}_q)$$

and will transform a vector, U, in E system to a vector, v, in the e system as

$$\mathbf{v}=\mathbf{GU}$$.

== The transformation law for two-point tensor ==
Suppose we have two coordinate systems one primed and another unprimed and a vectors' components transform between them as

$$v'_p = Q_{pq}v_q$$.

For tensors suppose we then have

$$T_{pq}(e_p \otimes e_q)$$.

A tensor in the system $e_i$. In another system, let the same tensor be given by

$$T'_{pq}(e'_p \otimes e'_q)$$.

We can say

$$T'_{ij} = Q_{ip} Q_{jr} T_{pr}$$.

Then

$$T' = QTQ^\mathsf{T}$$

is the routine tensor transformation. But a two-point tensor between these systems is just

$$F_{pq}(e'_p \otimes e_q)$$

which transforms as

$$F' = QF$$.

== Simple example ==
The most mundane example of a two-point tensor is the transformation tensor, the Q in the above discussion. Note that

$$v'_p=Q_{pq}u_q$$.

Now, writing out in full,

$$u=u_q e_q$$

and also

$$v=v'_p e'_p$$.

This then requires Q to be of the form

$$Q_{pq}(e'_p \otimes e_q)$$.

By definition of tensor product,

$(e'_p\otimes e_q)e_q=(e_q.e_q) e'_p =3 e'_p$	1

So we can write

$$u_p e_p = (Q_{pq}(e'_p \otimes e_q))(v_q e_q)$$

Thus

$$u_p e_p = Q_{pq} v_q(e'_p \otimes e_q) e_q$$

Incorporating (1), we have

$$u_p e_p = Q_{pq} v_q e_p$$.

== See also ==
- Mixed tensor
- Covariance and contravariance of vectors
