= Encyclopedic Dictionary of Mathematics =

- Cover of the first English edition published in 1977
- Original title: Iwanami Sūgaku Jiten (岩波数学辞典)
- Publisher: MIT Press
- Publication date: 1954
- ISBN: 9780262090162

The Encyclopedic Dictionary of Mathematics (EDM) is a translation of the Japanese Iwanami Sūgaku Jiten (岩波数学辞典). The editor of the first and second editions was Shokichi Iyanaga; the editor of the third edition was Kiyosi Itô; the fourth edition was edited by the Mathematical Society of Japan.

== Editions ==
- Iyanaga, Shōkichi, ed. (1954), Iwanami Sūgaku Jiten (in Japanese) (1st ed.), Tokyo: Iwanami Shoten, MR 0062668
- Iyanaga, Shōkichi, ed. (1960), Iwanami mathematical dictionary, Edited by the Mathematical Society of Japan. Revised and enlarged (in Japanese), Tokyo: Iwanami Shoten, MR 0130788
- Iyanaga, Shōkichi, ed. (1968), Iwanami Sūgaku Jiten (in Japanese) (2nd ed.), Iwanami Shoten Publishers, Tokyo, MR 0241228
- Iyanaga, Shōkichi, ed. (1977), Encyclopedic Dictionary of Mathematics, Volumes I, II, hardback, translated from the 2nd Japanese edition (1st ed.), MIT Press, pp. 1750, ISBN 978-0-262-09016-2, MR 0490100
- Iyanaga, Shōkichi; Kawada, Yukiyosi, eds. (1980) [1977], Encyclopedic Dictionary of Mathematics, Volumes I, II, Translated from the 2nd Japanese edition, paperback version of the 1977 edition (1st ed.), MIT Press, ISBN 978-0-262-59010-5, MR 0591028
- Sūgaku Jiten (in Japanese) (3rd ed.), Tokyo: Iwanami Shoten, 1985, ISBN 978-4-00-080016-7, MR 0924841
- Itô, Kiyosi, ed. (1987), Encyclopedic Dictionary of Mathematics. Vol. I--IV, Hardback, Translated from the Japanese 3rd edition (2nd ed.), MIT Press, p. 2148, ISBN 978-0-262-09026-1, MR 0901762, archived from the original on 2011-06-29
- Itô, Kiyosi, ed. (1993), Encyclopedic Dictionary of Mathematics. Vol. I--II, Paperback, Translated from the Japanese 3rd edition (2nd ed.), MIT Press, p. 2148, ISBN 0-262-59020-4; paperback version of the 1987 edition
- Iwanami Sūgaku Jiten (in Japanese) (Fourth ed.), Tokyo: Iwanami Shoten, 2007, ISBN 978-4-00-080309-0, MR 2383190
