= Squid giant synapse =

Chemical synapse found in squid

The squid giant synapse is a chemical synapse found in squid. It is the largest known chemical junction in nature.

== Anatomy ==
The squid giant synapse (Fig 1) was first recognized by John Zachary Young in 1939. It lies in the stellate ganglion on each side of the midline, at the posterior wall of the squid's muscular mantle. Activation of this synapse triggers a synchronous contraction of the mantle musculature, causing the forceful ejection of a jet of water from the mantle. This water propulsion allows the squid to move rapidly through the water and even to jump through the surface of the water (breaking the air–water interface) to escape predators.

The signal to the mantle is transmitted via a chain consisting of three giant neurons organized in sequence. The first is located in the ventral magnocellular lobe, central to the eyes. It serves as a central integrating manifold that receives all sensory systems and consists of two symmetrical neurons (I). They, in turn, contact secondary neurons (one in each side) in the dorsal magnocellular lobe and (II) and in turn contact the tertiary giant axons in the stellate ganglion (III, one in each side of the mantle). These latter are the giant axons that the work of Alan Hodgkin and Andrew Huxley made famous. Each secondary axon branches at the stellate ganglion and contacts all the tertiary axons; thus, information concerning relevant sensory input is relayed from the sense organs in the cephalic ganglion (the squid's brain) to the contractile muscular mantle (which is activated directly by the tertiary giant axons).

Fig 1. Upper left, side view of a squid. Upper right, the area inside the black square is enlarged in the diagram below, showing the giant neuronal system with the first (red) second (green) and third giant neuronal elements (brown). The arrows indicate the direction of transmission flow from the head ganglion towards the mantle. The light blue funnel is the site for water flow following rapid water expulsion when the mantle contracts (Modified from Llinás 1999).

== Electrophysiology ==
Many essential elements of how all chemical synapses function were first discovered by studying the squid giant synapse. Early electrophysiological studies demonstrated the chemical nature of transmission at this synapse by making simultaneous intracellular recording from the presynaptic and postsynaptic terminals in vitro (Bullock & Hagiwara 1957, Hagiwara & Tasaki 1958, Takeuchi & Takeuchi 1962). Classical experiments later on demonstrated that, in the absence of action potentials, transmission could occur (Bloedel et al. 1966, Katz & Miledi 1967, Kusano, Livengood & Werman 1967). The calcium hypothesis for synaptic transmission was directly demonstrated in this synapse by showing that at the equilibrium potential for calcium, no transmitter is released (Katz & Miledi 1967). Thus, calcium entry and not the change in the transmembrane electric field per se is responsible for transmitter release (Llinás et al. 1981, Augustine, Charlton & Smith 1985). This preparation continues to be the most useful for the study of the molecular and cell biological basis for transmitter release. Other important new mammalian preparations are now available for such studies such as the calyx of Held.

Fig 2. Upper left image: Enlarged picture of the squid stellate ganglion showing the giant synapse. Intracellular dye injection was used to stain the presynaptic axon green and the postsynaptic axon red. The presynpatic fiber has seven branches, each for one giant tertiary axon. Only the last postsynaptic axon on the right is colored. Lower left image: A) Simultaneous intracellular recording from the presynaptic fiber (pre) and the postsynaptic axon (post). The synaptic action potential releases a transmitter substance (glutamate) that acts on the postsynaptic receptors and activates the postsynaptic action potential. B and C) Synaptic transmission can be evoked with either a square voltage pulse (B) or an artificial action potential wave form (C) these are delivered to a command amplifier as shown in D. D. Diagram of a command amplifier (CO) and current injection amplifier (I) with a feedback control via presynaptic voltage (Pre V). The response to these stimuli is recorded as a current (Im) and displayed in green in E and F. E) Synaptic transmission and calcium current (ICa, green) evoked by a square voltage pulse (Pre). F) Calcium current (green) and postsynaptic potential (Post) evoked by an artificial action potential (Pre). Note that in F the calcium curren starts during the down swing of the presynaptic action potential (modified from Llinás 1999). Middle Image: Left, Voltage clamp records illustrating the relation between transmembrane voltage in mV (square wave at the bottom of each record) Calcium current amplitude in nA (middle record) and postsynaptic potential in mV. Time mark one ms. The voltage steps are generates from a holding potential of -170 mV. (Llinás et al. 1981). Right image: Relation between voltage and current for the "on" (red plot) and "tail" (white plot) calcium current. Voltage in mV current in nA (modified from Llinás 1999).

== See also ==
- Squid giant axon
