= Calcium concentration microdomains =

Calcium concentration microdomains (CCMs) are sites in a cell's cytoplasm with a localised high calcium ion (Ca^{2+}) concentration. They are found immediately around the intracellular opening of calcium channels; when a calcium channel opens, the Ca^{2+} concentration in the adjacent CCM increases up to several hundred micromolar (μM). These microdomains take part in calcium signaling, which has a diverse range of potential outcomes.

Calcium concentration microdomains can be visualised with fluorescence microscopy by using aequorin as a reporter protein.

== Ion channel process ==
The actions of the Na-K-ATPase enzyme relate with the creation of calcium-signaling microdomains. Na-K-ATPase is a protein that pumps Na^{+} and K^{+} across the cell membrane. Na-K-ATPase helps to keep the body at equilibrium by the movement of those ions through the plasma membrane. This ion pump helps to reset the movement of ions during an action potential by sending K^{+} into the cell and sending Na^{+} out of the cell. Since it opposes the normal flow of ions during an action potential, energy in the form of ATP (adenosine triphosphate) is used. Calcium is also regulated using this Na-K-ATPase due to the enzyme's interactions with protein and non-protein molecules. The main interaction that keeps calcium regulated is the binding of Na-K-ATPase to inositol 1,4,5-trisphosphate (IP3). IP3 is a secondary messenger that helps to send neuronal signals through the body. The neuronal cells have the calcium-signaling microdomains in the cytoplasm right next to the pre- and post-synaptic calcium channels in the nerve cells. Figure 1 is an example of how Na-K-ATPase forms the calcium-signaling microdomain.

The astrocytes which are star-shaped glial cells in the central nervous system are the main cells with these calcium-signaling micro domains. In fact, a rigorous mathematical analysis in astrocytes has shown that localized inflow of Ca^{2+} remains localized, despite the diffusion of cytosolic Ca^{2+} and potential storage in the endoplasmic reticulum.

A Na^{+}/Ca^{2+} exchanger (NCX) is also involved in regulating the amount of calcium in cells. The NCX switches the intra- and extra-cellular amounts of Na^{+} and Ca^{2+}. NCX works together with Na-K-ATPase to create calcium concentration microdomains in certain cells like astrocytes discussed above. Specific forms of Na-K-ATPase, the α2 or α3 isoforms, actually interact with the NCX in the formation of the calcium microdomains in astrocytes.
