= Cotangent space =

Dual space to the tangent space in differential geometry

In differential geometry, the cotangent space is a vector space associated with a point $x$ on a smooth (or differentiable) manifold $\mathcal M$; one can define a cotangent space for every point on a smooth manifold. Typically, the cotangent space, $T^*_x\!\mathcal M$ is defined as the dual space of the tangent space at $x$, $T_x\mathcal M$, although there are more direct definitions (see below). The elements of the cotangent space are called cotangent vectors or tangent covectors.

== Properties ==
All cotangent spaces at points on a connected manifold have the same dimension, equal to the dimension of the manifold. All the cotangent spaces of a manifold can be "glued together" (i.e. unioned and endowed with a topology) to form a new differentiable manifold of twice the dimension, the cotangent bundle of the manifold.

The tangent space and the cotangent space at a point are both real vector spaces of the same dimension and therefore isomorphic to each other via many possible isomorphisms. The introduction of a Riemannian metric or a symplectic form gives rise to a natural isomorphism between the tangent space and the cotangent space at a point, associating to any tangent covector a canonical tangent vector.

== Formal definitions ==
=== Definition as linear functionals ===
Let $\mathcal M$ be a smooth manifold and let $x$ be a point in $\mathcal M$. Let $T_x\mathcal M$ be the tangent space at $x$. Then the cotangent space at $x$ is defined as the dual space of $T_x\mathcal M$:

$$T^*_x\!\mathcal M = (T_x \mathcal M)^*$$

Concretely, elements of the cotangent space are linear functionals on $T_x\mathcal M$. That is, every element $\alpha\in T^*_x\mathcal M$ is a linear map

$$\alpha:T_x\mathcal M \to F$$

where $F$ is the underlying field of the vector space being considered, for example, the field of real numbers. The elements of $T^*_x\!\mathcal M$ are called cotangent vectors.

=== Alternative definition ===
In some cases, one might like to have a direct definition of the cotangent space without reference to the tangent space. Such a definition can be formulated in terms of equivalence classes of smooth functions on $\mathcal M$. Informally, we will say that two smooth functions f and g are equivalent at a point $x$ if they have the same first-order behavior near $x$, analogous to their linear Taylor polynomials; two functions f and g have the same first order behavior near $x$ if and only if the derivative of the function f − g vanishes at $x$. The cotangent space will then consist of all the possible first-order behaviors of a function near $x$.

Let $\mathcal M$ be a smooth manifold and let $x$ be a point in $\mathcal M$. Let $I_x$be the ideal of all functions in $C^\infty\! (\mathcal M)$ vanishing at $x$, and let $I_x^2$ be the set of functions of the form $\sum_i f_i g_i$, where $f_i, g_i \in I_x$. Then $I_x$ and $I_x^2$ are both real vector spaces and the cotangent space can be defined as the quotient space $T^*_x\!\mathcal M = I_x/I^2_x$ by showing that the two spaces are isomorphic to each other.

This formulation is analogous to the construction of the cotangent space to define the Zariski tangent space in algebraic geometry. The construction also generalizes to locally ringed spaces.

== The differential of a function ==
Let $M$ be a smooth manifold and let $f\in C^\infty(M)$ be a smooth function. The differential of $f$ at a point $x$ is the map

$$\mathrm d f_x(X_x) = X_x(f)$$

where $X_x$ is a tangent vector at $x$, thought of as a derivation. That is $X(f)=\mathcal{L}_Xf$ is the Lie derivative of $f$ in the direction $X$, and one has $\mathrm df(X)=X(f)$. Equivalently, we can think of tangent vectors as tangents to curves, and write

$$\mathrm d f_x(\gamma'(0))=(f\circ\gamma)'(0)$$

In either case, $\mathrm df_x$ is a linear map on $T_xM$ and hence it is a tangent covector at $x$.

We can then define the differential map $\mathrm d:C^\infty(M)\to T_x^*(M)$ at a point $x$ as the map which sends $f$ to $\mathrm df_x$. Properties of the differential map include:

1. $\mathrm d$ is a linear map: $\mathrm d(af+bg)=a\mathrm df + b\mathrm dg$ for constants $a$ and $b$,
2. $\mathrm d(fg)_x=f(x)\mathrm dg_x+g(x)\mathrm df_x$

The differential map provides the link between the two alternate definitions of the cotangent space given above. Since for all $f \in I^2_x$ there exist $g_i, h_i \in I_x$ such that $f=\sum_i g_i h_i$, we have,

$\begin{array}{rcl} \mathrm d f_x & = & \sum_i \mathrm d (g_i h_i)_x \\ & = & \sum_i (g_i(x)\mathrm d(h_i)_x+\mathrm d(g_i)_x h_{i}(x)) \\ & = & \sum_i (0\mathrm d(h_i)_x+\mathrm d(g_i)_x 0) \\ & = & 0 \end{array}$

So that all function in $I^2_x$ have differential zero, it follows that for every two functions $f \in I^2_x$, $g \in I_x$, we have $\mathrm d (f+g)=\mathrm d (g)$. We can now construct an isomorphism between $T^*_x\!\mathcal M$ and $I_x/I^2_x$ by sending linear maps $\alpha$ to the corresponding cosets $\alpha + I^2_x$. Since there is a unique linear map for a given kernel and slope, this is an isomorphism, establishing the equivalence of the two definitions.

== The pullback of a smooth map ==
Just as every differentiable map $f:M\to N$ between manifolds induces a linear map (called the pushforward or derivative) between the tangent spaces

$$f_{*}^{}\colon T_x M \to T_{f(x)} N$$

every such map induces a linear map (called the pullback) between the cotangent spaces, only this time in the reverse direction:

$$f^{*}\colon T_{f(x)}^{*} N \to T_{x}^{*} M .$$

The pullback is naturally defined as the dual (or transpose) of the pushforward. Unraveling the definition, this means the following:

$$(f^{*}\theta)(X_x) = \theta(f_{*}^{}X_x) ,$$

where $\theta\in T_{f(x)}^*N$ and $X_x\in T_xM$. Note carefully where everything lives.

If we define tangent covectors in terms of equivalence classes of smooth maps vanishing at a point then the definition of the pullback is even more straightforward. Let $g$ be a smooth function on $N$ vanishing at $f(x)$. Then the pullback of the covector determined by $g$ (denoted $\mathrm d g$) is given by

$$f^{*}\mathrm dg = \mathrm d(g \circ f).$$

That is, it is the equivalence class of functions on $M$ vanishing at $x$ determined by $g\circ f$.

== Exterior powers ==
The $k$-th exterior power of the cotangent space, denoted $\Lambda^k(T_x^*\mathcal{M})$, is another important object in differential and algebraic geometry. Vectors in the $k$-th exterior power, or more precisely sections of the $k$-th exterior power of the cotangent bundle, are called differential $k$-forms. They can be thought of as alternating, multilinear maps on $k$ tangent vectors. For this reason, tangent covectors are frequently called one-forms.
