= Eigenplane =

In mathematics, an eigenplane is a two-dimensional invariant subspace in a given vector space. By analogy with the term eigenvector for a vector which, when operated on by a linear operator is another vector which is a scalar multiple of itself, the term eigenplane can be used to describe a two-dimensional plane (a 2-plane), such that the operation of a linear operator on a vector in the 2-plane always yields another vector in the same 2-plane.

A particular case that has been studied is that in which the linear operator is an isometry M of the hypersphere (written S^{3}) represented within four-dimensional Euclidean space:

$$M \; [  \mathbf{s} \;  \mathbf{t} ] \; = \; [ \mathbf{s} \; \mathbf{t} ] \Lambda_\theta$$

where s and t are four-dimensional column vectors and Λ_{θ} is a two-dimensional eigenrotation within the eigenplane.

In the usual eigenvector problem, there is freedom to multiply an eigenvector by an arbitrary scalar; in this case there is freedom to multiply by an arbitrary non-zero rotation.

This case is potentially physically interesting in the case that the shape of the universe is a multiply connected 3-manifold, since finding the angles of the eigenrotations of a candidate isometry for topological lensing is a way to falsify such hypotheses.

== See also ==
- Bivector
- Plane of rotation
