= Bivector =

Sum of directed areas in exterior algebra

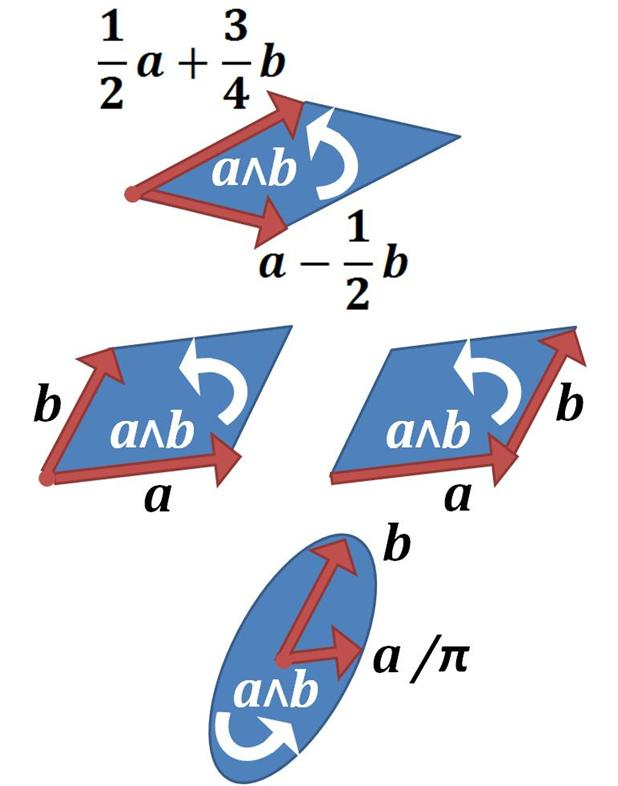
Parallel plane segments with the same orientation and area corresponding to the same bivector a ∧ b.

In mathematics, a bivector or 2-vector is a quantity in exterior algebra or geometric algebra that extends the idea of scalars and vectors. Considering a scalar as a degree-zero quantity and a vector as a degree-one quantity, a bivector is of degree two. Bivectors have applications in many areas of mathematics and physics. They are related to complex numbers in two dimensions and to both pseudovectors and vector quaternions in three dimensions. They can be used to generate rotations in a space of any number of dimensions, and are a useful tool for classifying such rotations.

Geometrically, a simple bivector can be interpreted as characterizing a directed plane segment (or oriented plane segment), much as vectors can be thought of as characterizing directed line segments. The bivector a ∧ b has an attitude (or direction) of the plane spanned by a and b, has an area that is a scalar multiple of any reference plane segment with the same attitude (and in geometric algebra, it has a magnitude equal to the area of the parallelogram with edges a and b), and has an orientation being the side of a on which b lies within the plane spanned by a and b. In layman terms, any surface defines the same bivector if it is parallel to the same plane (same attitude), has the same area, and same orientation (see figure).

Bivectors are generated by the exterior product on vectors: given two vectors a and b, their exterior product a ∧ b is a bivector, as is any sum of bivectors. Not all bivectors can be expressed as an exterior product without such summation. More precisely, a bivector that can be expressed as an exterior product is called simple; in up to three dimensions all bivectors are simple, but in higher dimensions this is not the case. The exterior product of two vectors is alternating, so a ∧ a is the zero bivector, and b ∧ a = −a ∧ b, producing the opposite orientation. Concepts directly related to bivectors are rank-2 antisymmetric tensor and skew-symmetric matrix.

== History ==
The bivector was first defined in 1844 by German mathematician Hermann Grassmann in exterior algebra as the result of the exterior product of two vectors. Just the previous year, in Ireland, William Rowan Hamilton had discovered quaternions. Hamilton coined both vector and bivector, the latter in his Lectures on Quaternions (1853) as he introduced biquaternions, which have bivectors for their vector parts. It was not until English mathematician William Kingdon Clifford in 1878 added the geometric product to Grassmann's algebra, incorporating the ideas of both Hamilton and Grassmann, and founded Clifford algebra, that the bivector of this article arose. Henry Forder used the term bivector to develop exterior algebra in 1941.

In the 1890s Josiah Willard Gibbs and Oliver Heaviside developed vector calculus, which included separate cross product and dot products that were derived from quaternion multiplication. The success of vector calculus, and of the book Vector Analysis by Gibbs and Wilson, had the effect that the insights of Hamilton and Clifford were overlooked for a long time, since much of 20th century mathematics and physics was formulated in vector terms. Gibbs used vectors to fill the role of bivectors in three dimensions, and used bivector in Hamilton's sense, a use that has sometimes been copied. Today the bivector is largely studied as a topic in geometric algebra, a Clifford algebra over real or complex vector spaces with a quadratic form. Its resurgence was led by David Hestenes who, along with others, applied geometric algebra to a range of new applications in physics.

== Derivation ==
For this article, the bivector will be considered only in real geometric algebras, which may be applied in most areas of physics. Also unless otherwise stated, all examples have a Euclidean metric and so a positive-definite quadratic form.

=== Geometric algebra and the geometric product ===
The bivector arises from the definition of the geometric product over a vector space with an associated quadratic form sometimes called the metric. For vectors a, b and c, the geometric product satisfies the following properties:

Associativity
$$(\mathbf{ab})\mathbf{c} = \mathbf{a}(\mathbf{bc})$$
Left and right distributivity
$$\begin{align}
\mathbf{a}(\mathbf{b} + \mathbf{c}) &= \mathbf{ab} + \mathbf{ac} \\
(\mathbf{b} + \mathbf{c})\mathbf{a} &= \mathbf{ba} + \mathbf{ca}
\end{align}$$
Scalar square
$\mathbf{a}^2 = Q(\mathbf{a})$, where Q is the quadratic form, which need not be positive-definite.

=== Scalar product ===
From associativity, a(ab) = a^{2}b, is a scalar times b. When b is not parallel to and hence not a scalar multiple of a, ab cannot be a scalar. But

$$\tfrac{1}{2}(\mathbf{ab} + \mathbf{ba}) = \tfrac{1}{2} \left((\mathbf{a} + \mathbf{b})^2 - \mathbf{a}^2 - \mathbf{b}^2\right)$$

is a sum of scalars and so a scalar. From the law of cosines on the triangle formed by the vectors its value is |a| |b| cos θ, where θ is the angle between the vectors. It is therefore identical to the scalar product between two vectors, and is written the same way,

$$\mathbf{a} \cdot \mathbf{b} = \tfrac{1}{2}(\mathbf{ab} + \mathbf{ba}).$$

It is symmetric, scalar-valued, and can be used to determine the angle between two vectors: in particular if a and b are orthogonal the product is zero.

=== Exterior product ===
Just as the scalar product can be formulated as the symmetric part of the geometric product of another quantity, the exterior product (sometimes known as the "wedge" or "progressive" product) can be formulated as its antisymmetric part:

$$\mathbf{a} \wedge \mathbf{b} = \tfrac{1}{2}(\mathbf{ab} - \mathbf{ba})$$

It is antisymmetric in a and b

$$\mathbf{b} \wedge \mathbf{a} = \tfrac{1}{2}(\mathbf{ba} - \mathbf{ab})  = -\tfrac{1}{2}(\mathbf{ab} - \mathbf{ba}) = -\mathbf{a} \wedge \mathbf{b}$$

and by addition:

$$\mathbf{a} \cdot \mathbf{b} + \mathbf{a} \wedge \mathbf{b} = \tfrac{1}{2}(\mathbf{ab} + \mathbf{ba}) + \tfrac{1}{2}(\mathbf{ab} - \mathbf{ba}) = \mathbf{ab}$$

That is, the geometric product is the sum of the symmetric scalar product and alternating exterior product.

To examine the nature of a ∧ b, consider the formula

$$(\mathbf{a} \cdot \mathbf{b})^2 - (\mathbf{a} \wedge \mathbf{b})^2 = \mathbf{a}^2\mathbf{b}^2,$$

which using the Pythagorean trigonometric identity gives the value of (a ∧ b)^{2}

$$(\mathbf{a} \wedge \mathbf{b})^2 = (\mathbf{a} \cdot \mathbf{b})^2 - \mathbf{a}^2\mathbf{b}^2 = \left|\mathbf{a}\right|^2\left|\mathbf{b}\right|^2( \cos^2 \theta - 1) = -\left|\mathbf{a}\right|^2\left|\mathbf{b}\right|^2\sin^2 \theta$$

With a negative square, it cannot be a scalar or vector quantity, so it is a new sort of object, a bivector. It has magnitude |a| |b| |sin θ|, where θ is the angle between the vectors, and so is zero for parallel vectors.

To distinguish them from vectors, bivectors are written here with bold capitals, for example:

$$\mathbf{A} = \mathbf{a} \wedge \mathbf{b} = -\mathbf{b} \wedge \mathbf{a} \,,$$

although other conventions are used, in particular as vectors and bivectors are both elements of the geometric algebra.

== Properties ==
The algebra generated by the geometric product (that is, all objects formed by taking repeated sums and geometric products of scalars and vectors) is the geometric algebra over the vector space. For an Euclidean vector space, this algebra is written $\mathcal{G}_n$ or Cl_{n}(R), where n is the dimension of the vector space R^{n}. Cl_{n}(R) is both a vector space and an algebra, generated by all the products between vectors in R^{n}, so it contains all vectors and bivectors. More precisely, as a vector space it contains the vectors and bivectors as linear subspaces, though not as subalgebras (since the geometric product of two vectors is not generally another vector).

=== The space ⋀^{2}R^{n} ===
The space of all bivectors has dimension 1/2n(n − 1) and is written ⋀^{2}R^{n}, and is the second exterior power of the original vector space.

=== Even subalgebra ===
The subalgebra generated by the bivectors is the even subalgebra of the geometric algebra, written Cl^{[0]}_{n}(R). This algebra results from considering all repeated sums and geometric products of scalars and bivectors. It has dimension 2^{n−1}, and contains ⋀^{2}R^{n} as a linear subspace. In two and three dimensions the even subalgebra contains only scalars and bivectors, and each is of particular interest. In two dimensions, the even subalgebra is isomorphic to the complex numbers, C, while in three it is isomorphic to the quaternions, H. The even subalgebra contains the rotations in any dimension.

=== Magnitude ===
As noted in the previous section the magnitude of a simple bivector, that is one that is the exterior product of two vectors a and b, is |a| |b| sin θ, where θ is the angle between the vectors. It is written |B|, where B is the bivector.

For general bivectors, the magnitude can be calculated by taking the norm of the bivector considered as a vector in the space ⋀^{2}R^{n}. If the magnitude is zero then all the bivector's components are zero, and the bivector is the zero bivector which as an element of the geometric algebra equals the scalar zero.

=== Unit bivectors ===
A unit bivector is one with unit magnitude. Such a bivector can be derived from any non-zero bivector by dividing the bivector by its magnitude, that is

$$\frac{\mathbf{B}}{\left\vert\mathbf{B}\right\vert}.$$

Of particular utility are the unit bivectors formed from the products of the standard basis of the vector space. If e_{i} and e_{j} are distinct basis vectors then the product e_{i} ∧ e_{j} is a bivector. As e_{i} and e_{j} are orthogonal, e_{i} ∧ e_{j} = e_{i}e_{j}, written e_{ij}, and has unit magnitude as the vectors are unit vectors. The set of all bivectors produced from the basis in this way form a basis for ⋀^{2}R^{n}. For instance, in four dimensions the basis for ⋀^{2}R^{4} is (e_{1}e_{2}, e_{1}e_{3}, e_{1}e_{4}, e_{2}e_{3}, e_{2}e_{4}, e_{3}e_{4}) or (e_{12}, e_{13}, e_{14}, e_{23}, e_{24}, e_{34}).

=== Simple bivectors ===
The exterior product of two vectors is a bivector, but not all bivectors are exterior products of two vectors. For example, in four dimensions the bivector

$$\mathbf{B} = \mathbf{e}_1 \wedge \mathbf{e}_2 + \mathbf{e}_3 \wedge \mathbf{e}_4 = \mathbf{e}_1\mathbf{e}_2 + \mathbf{e}_3\mathbf{e}_4 = \mathbf{e}_{12} + \mathbf{e}_{34}$$

cannot be written as the exterior product of two vectors. A bivector that can be written as the exterior product of two vectors is simple. In two and three dimensions all bivectors are simple, but not in four or more dimensions; in four dimensions every bivector is the sum of at most two exterior products. A bivector has a real square if and only if it is simple, and only simple bivectors can be represented geometrically by a directed plane area.

=== Product of two bivectors ===
The geometric product of two bivectors, A and B, is

$$\mathbf{A}\mathbf{B} = \mathbf{A} \cdot \mathbf{B} + \mathbf{A} \times \mathbf{B} + \mathbf{A} \wedge \mathbf{B}.$$

The quantity A · B is the scalar-valued scalar product, while A ∧ B is the grade 4 exterior product that arises in four or more dimensions. The quantity A × B is the bivector-valued commutator product, given by

$\mathbf{A} \times \mathbf{B} = \tfrac{1}{2}(\mathbf{AB} - \mathbf{BA}),$

The space of bivectors ⋀^{2}R^{n} is a Lie algebra over R, with the commutator product as the Lie bracket. The full geometric product of bivectors generates the even subalgebra.

Of particular interest is the product of a bivector with itself. As the commutator product is antisymmetric the product simplifies to

$$\mathbf{A}\mathbf{A} = \mathbf{A} \cdot \mathbf{A} + \mathbf{A} \wedge \mathbf{A}.$$

If the bivector is simple the last term is zero and the product is the scalar-valued A · A, which can be used as a check for simplicity. In particular the exterior product of bivectors only exists in four or more dimensions, so all bivectors in two and three dimensions are simple.

=== General bivectors and matrices ===
Bivectors are isomorphic to skew-symmetric matrices in any number of dimensions. For example, the general bivector B_{23}e_{23} + B_{31}e_{31} + B_{12}e_{12} in three dimensions maps to the matrix

$$M_B = \begin{pmatrix} 0 & B_{12} &  -B_{31} \\ -B_{12} & 0 & B_{23}\\ B_{31} & -B_{23} & 0  \end{pmatrix}.$$

This multiplied by vectors on both sides gives the same vector as the product of a vector and bivector minus the exterior product; an example is the angular velocity tensor.

Skew symmetric matrices generate orthogonal matrices with determinant 1 through the exponential map. In particular, applying the exponential map to a bivector that is associated with a rotation yields a rotation matrix. The rotation matrix M_{R} given by the skew-symmetric matrix above is

$$M_R = \exp{M_B}.$$

The rotation described by M_{R} is the same as that described by the rotor R given by

$$R = \exp{\tfrac{1}{2} B},$$

and the matrix M_{R} can be also calculated directly from rotor R. In three dimensions, this is given by

$$M_R = \begin{pmatrix} (R\mathbf{e}_1R^{-1}) \cdot \mathbf{e}_1 & (R\mathbf{e}_2R^{-1}) \cdot \mathbf{e}_1 & (R\mathbf{e}_3R^{-1}) \cdot \mathbf{e}_1 \\ (R\mathbf{e}_1R^{-1}) \cdot \mathbf{e}_2 & (R\mathbf{e}_2R^{-1}) \cdot \mathbf{e}_2 & (R\mathbf{e}_3R^{-1}) \cdot \mathbf{e}_2 \\ (R\mathbf{e}_1R^{-1}) \cdot \mathbf{e}_3 & (R\mathbf{e}_2R^{-1}) \cdot \mathbf{e}_3 & (R\mathbf{e}_3R^{-1}) \cdot \mathbf{e}_3 \end{pmatrix}.$$

Bivectors are related to the eigenvalues of a rotation matrix. Given a rotation matrix M the eigenvalues can be calculated by solving the characteristic equation for that matrix 0 = det(M − λI). By the fundamental theorem of algebra this has three roots (only one of which is real as there is only one eigenvector, i.e., the axis of rotation). The other roots must be a complex conjugate pair. They have unit magnitude so purely imaginary logarithms, equal to the magnitude of the bivector associated with the rotation, which is also the angle of rotation. The eigenvectors associated with the complex eigenvalues are in the plane of the bivector, so the exterior product of two non-parallel eigenvectors results in the bivector (or a multiple thereof).

== Two dimensions ==
When working with coordinates in geometric algebra it is usual to write the basis vectors as (e_{1}, e_{2}, ...), a convention that will be used here.

A vector in real two-dimensional space R^{2} can be written a = a_{1}e_{1} + a_{2}e_{2}, where a_{1} and a_{2} are real numbers, e_{1} and e_{2} are orthonormal basis vectors. The geometric product of two such vectors is

$$\begin{align} \mathbf{a}\mathbf{b} &= (a_1\mathbf{e}_1 + a_2\mathbf{e}_2)(b_1\mathbf{e}_1 + b_2\mathbf{e}_2) \\&= a_1b_1\mathbf{e}_1\mathbf{e}_1 + a_1b_2\mathbf{e}_1\mathbf{e}_2 + a_2b_1\mathbf{e}_2\mathbf{e}_1 + a_2b_2\mathbf{e}_2\mathbf{e}_2 \\&= a_1b_1 + a_2b_2 + (a_1b_2 - a_2b_1)\mathbf{e}_1\mathbf{e}_2. \end{align}$$

This can be split into the symmetric, scalar-valued, scalar product and an antisymmetric, bivector-valued exterior product:

$$\begin{align} \mathbf{a} \cdot \mathbf{b} &= a_1b_1 + a_2b_2, \\ \mathbf{a} \wedge \mathbf{b} &= (a_1b_2 - a_2b_1)\mathbf{e}_1\mathbf{e}_2 = (a_1b_2 - a_2b_1)\mathbf{e}_{12}. \end{align}$$

All bivectors in two dimensions are of this form, that is multiples of the bivector e_{1}e_{2}, written e_{12} to emphasise it is a bivector rather than a vector. The magnitude of e_{12} is 1, with

$$\mathbf{e}_{12}^2 = -1,$$

so it is called the unit bivector. The term unit bivector can be used in other dimensions but it is only uniquely defined (up to a sign) in two dimensions and all bivectors are multiples of e_{12}. As the highest grade element of the algebra e_{12} is also the pseudoscalar which is given the symbol i.

=== Complex numbers ===
With the properties of negative square and unit magnitude, the unit bivector can be identified with the imaginary unit from complex numbers. The bivectors and scalars together form the even subalgebra of the geometric algebra, which is isomorphic to the complex numbers C. The even subalgebra has basis (1, e_{12}), the whole algebra has basis (1, e_{1}, e_{2}, e_{12}).

The complex numbers are usually identified with the coordinate axes and two-dimensional vectors, which would mean associating them with the vector elements of the geometric algebra. There is no contradiction in this, as to get from a general vector to a complex number an axis needs to be identified as the real axis, e_{1} say. This multiplies by all vectors to generate the elements of even subalgebra.

All the properties of complex numbers can be derived from bivectors, but two are of particular interest. First as with complex numbers products of bivectors and so the even subalgebra are commutative. This is only true in two dimensions, so properties of the bivector in two dimensions that depend on commutativity do not usually generalise to higher dimensions.

Second a general bivector can be written

$$\theta\mathbf{e}_{12} = i\theta,$$

where θ is a real number. Putting this into the Taylor series for the exponential map and using the property e_{12}^{2} = −1 results in a bivector version of Euler's formula,

$$\exp{\theta\mathbf{e}_{12}} = \exp{i\theta} = \cos{\theta} + i\sin{\theta},$$

which when multiplied by any vector rotates it through an angle θ about the origin:

$$(x'\mathbf{e}_1 + y'\mathbf{e}_2) = (x\mathbf{e}_1 + y\mathbf{e}_2) \exp {i\theta}.$$

The product of a vector with a bivector in two dimensions is anticommutative, so the following products all generate the same rotation

$$\mathbf{v}' = \mathbf{v} \exp{i\theta} = \exp(-i\theta)\,\mathbf{v} = \exp({-i\theta}/{2})\,\mathbf{v} \exp({i\theta}/{2}).$$

Of these the last product is the one that generalises into higher dimensions. The quantity needed is called a rotor and is given the symbol R, so in two dimensions a rotor that rotates through angle θ can be written

$$R = \exp({-\tfrac{1}{2} i\theta}) = \exp({-\tfrac{1}{2}\theta\mathbf{e}_{12}}),$$

and the rotation it generates is

$$\mathbf{v}' = R\mathbf{v}R^{-1}.$$

== Three dimensions ==
In three dimensions the geometric product of two vectors is

$$\begin{align} \mathbf{ab} &= (a_1\mathbf{e}_1 + a_2\mathbf{e}_2 + a_3\mathbf{e}_3)(b_1\mathbf{e}_1 + b_2\mathbf{e}_2 + b_3\mathbf{e}_3) \\ &= a_1 b_1{\mathbf{e}_1}^2 + a_2 b_2{\mathbf{e}_2}^2 + a_3 b_3{\mathbf{e}_3}^2 + (a_2 b_3 - a_3 b_2)\mathbf{e}_2\mathbf{e}_3  + (a_3 b_1 - a_1 b_3)\mathbf{e}_3\mathbf{e}_1 + (a_1 b_2 - a_2 b_1)\mathbf{e}_1\mathbf{e}_2. \end{align}$$

This can be split into the symmetric, scalar-valued, scalar product and the antisymmetric, bivector-valued, exterior product:

$$\begin{align} \mathbf{a} \cdot \mathbf{b} &= a_1b_1 + a_2b_2 + a_3b_3 \\ \mathbf{a} \wedge \mathbf{b} &= (a_2 b_3 - a_3 b_2)\mathbf{e}_{23} + (a_3 b_1 - a_1 b_3)\mathbf{e}_{31} + (a_1 b_2 - a_2 b_1)\mathbf{e}_{12}. \end{align}$$

In three dimensions all bivectors are simple and so the result of an exterior product. The unit bivectors e_{23}, e_{31} and e_{12} form a basis for the space of bivectors ⋀^{2}R^{3}, which is itself a three-dimensional linear space. So if a general bivector is:

$$\mathbf{A} = A_{23}\mathbf{e}_{23} + A_{31}\mathbf{e}_{31} + A_{12}\mathbf{e}_{12},$$

they can be added like vectors

$$\mathbf{A} + \mathbf{B} = (A_{23} + B_{23})\mathbf{e}_{23} + (A_{31} + B_{31})\mathbf{e}_{31} + (A_{12} + B_{12})\mathbf{e}_{12}.$$

while when multiplied they produce the following

$$\mathbf{A} \mathbf{B} = -A_{23}B_{23} - A_{31}B_{31} - A_{12}B_{12} + (A_{12}B_{31} - A_{31}B_{12})\mathbf{e}_{23} + (A_{23}B_{12} - A_{12}B_{23})\mathbf{e}_{31} + (A_{31}B_{23} - A_{23}B_{31})\mathbf{e}_{12}$$

which can be split into symmetric scalar and antisymmetric bivector parts as follows

$$\begin{align} \mathbf{A} \cdot \mathbf{B} &= -A_{12}B_{12} - A_{31}B_{31} - A_{23}B_{23} \\ \mathbf{A} \times \mathbf{B} &= (A_{23}B_{31} - A_{31}B_{23})\mathbf{e}_{12} + (A_{12}B_{23} - A_{23}B_{12})\mathbf{e}_{13} + (A_{31}B_{12} - A_{12}B_{31})\mathbf{e}_{23}. \end{align}$$

The exterior product of two bivectors in three dimensions is zero.

A bivector B can be written as the product of its magnitude and a unit bivector, so writing β for |B| and using the Taylor series for the exponential map it can be shown that

$$\exp{\mathbf{B}} = \exp({\beta\frac{\mathbf{B}}{\beta}}) = \cos{\beta} + \frac{\mathbf{B}}{\beta}\sin{\beta}.$$

This is another version of Euler's formula, but with a general bivector in three dimensions. Unlike in two dimensions bivectors are not commutative so properties that depend on commutativity do not apply in three dimensions. For example, in general exp(A + B) ≠ exp(A) exp(B) in three (or more) dimensions.

The full geometric algebra in three dimensions, Cl_{3}(R), has basis (1, e_{1}, e_{2}, e_{3}, e_{23}, e_{31}, e_{12}, e_{123}). The element e_{123} is a trivector and the pseudoscalar for the geometry. Bivectors in three dimensions are sometimes identified with pseudovectors to which they are related, as discussed below.

=== Quaternions ===
Bivectors are not closed under the geometric product, but the even subalgebra is. In three dimensions it consists of all scalar and bivector elements of the geometric algebra, so a general element can be written for example a + A, where a is the scalar part and A is the bivector part. It is written Cl^{[0]}_{3} and has basis (1, e_{23}, e_{31}, e_{12}). The product of two general elements of the even subalgebra is

$$(a + \mathbf{A})(b + \mathbf{B}) = ab + a\mathbf{B} + b\mathbf{A} + \mathbf{A} \cdot \mathbf{B} + \mathbf{A} \times \mathbf{B}.$$

The even subalgebra, that is the algebra consisting of scalars and bivectors, is isomorphic to the quaternions, H. This can be seen by comparing the basis to the quaternion basis, or from the above product which is identical to the quaternion product, except for a change of sign which relates to the negative products in the bivector scalar product A · B. Other quaternion properties can be similarly related to or derived from geometric algebra.

This suggests that the usual split of a quaternion into scalar and vector parts would be better represented as a split into scalar and bivector parts; if this is done the quaternion product is merely the geometric product. It also relates quaternions in three dimensions to complex numbers in two, as each is isomorphic to the even subalgebra for the dimension, a relationship that generalises to higher dimensions.

=== Rotation vector ===
The rotation vector, from the axis–angle representation of rotations, is a compact way of representing rotations in three dimensions. In its most compact form, it consists of a vector, the product of a unit vector ω that is the axis of rotation with the (signed) angle of rotation θ, so that the magnitude of the overall rotation vector θω equals the (unsigned) rotation angle.

The quaternion associated with the rotation is

$$q = \left(\cos{\tfrac{{1}}{2} \theta}, \omega \sin{\tfrac{1}{2} \theta}\right)$$

In geometric algebra the rotation is represented by a bivector. This can be seen in its relation to quaternions. Let Ω be a unit bivector in the plane of rotation, and let θ be the angle of rotation. Then the rotation bivector is Ωθ. The quaternion closely corresponds to the exponential of half of the bivector Ωθ. That is, the components of the quaternion correspond to the scalar and bivector parts of the following expression:
$$\exp{\tfrac{1}{2} \boldsymbol{\Omega} \theta} = \cos{\tfrac{1}{2} \theta} + \boldsymbol{\Omega}\sin{\tfrac{1}{2} \theta}$$

The exponential can be defined in terms of its power series, and easily evaluated using the fact that Ω squared is −1.

So rotations can be represented by bivectors. Just as quaternions are elements of the geometric algebra, they are related by the exponential map in that algebra.

=== Rotors ===
The bivector Ωθ generates a rotation through the exponential map. The even elements generated rotate a general vector in three dimensions in the same way as quaternions:
$$\mathbf{v}' = \exp(-\tfrac{1}{2} \boldsymbol{\Omega} \theta)\,\mathbf{v} \exp(\tfrac{1}{2} \boldsymbol{\Omega} \theta).$$

As in two dimensions, the quantity exp(−1/2Ωθ) is called a rotor and written R. The quantity exp(1/2Ωθ) is then R^{−1}, and they generate rotations as
$$\mathbf{v}' = R\mathbf{v}R^{-1}.$$

This is identical to two dimensions, except here rotors are four-dimensional objects isomorphic to the quaternions. This can be generalised to all dimensions, with rotors, elements of the even subalgebra with unit magnitude, being generated by the exponential map from bivectors. They form a double cover over the rotation group, so the rotors R and −R represent the same rotation.

=== Axial vectors ===
The 3-angular momentum as a bivector (plane element) and axial vector, of a particle of mass m with instantaneous 3-position x and 3-momentum p.

The rotation vector is an example of an axial vector. Axial vectors, or pseudovectors, are vectors with the special feature that their coordinates undergo a sign change relative to the usual vectors (also called "polar vectors") under inversion through the origin, reflection in a plane, or other orientation-reversing linear transformation. Examples include quantities like torque, angular momentum and vector magnetic fields. Quantities that would use axial vectors in vector algebra are properly represented by bivectors in geometric algebra. More precisely, if an underlying orientation is chosen, the axial vectors are naturally identified with the usual vectors; the Hodge dual then gives the isomorphism between axial vectors and bivectors, so each axial vector is associated with a bivector and vice versa; that is

$$\mathbf{A} = {\star} \mathbf{a} \,,\quad \mathbf{a} = {\star} \mathbf{A}$$

where ${\star}$ is the Hodge star. Note that if the underlying orientation is reversed by inversion through the origin, both the identification of the axial vectors with the usual vectors and the Hodge dual change sign, but the bivectors don't budge. Alternately, using the unit pseudoscalar in Cl_{3}(R), i = e_{1}e_{2}e_{3} gives

$$\mathbf{A} = \mathbf{a}i \,,\quad \mathbf{a} = - \mathbf{A} i.$$

This is easier to use as the product is just the geometric product. But it is antisymmetric because (as in two dimensions) the unit pseudoscalar i squares to −1, so a negative is needed in one of the products.

This relationship extends to operations like the vector-valued cross product and bivector-valued exterior product, as when written as determinants they are calculated in the same way:

$$\mathbf{a} \times \mathbf{b} = \begin{vmatrix} \mathbf{e}_1 & \mathbf{e}_2 & \mathbf{e}_3\\a_1 & a_2 & a_3\\b_1 & b_2 & b_3 \end{vmatrix} \,,\quad \mathbf{a} \wedge \mathbf{b} = \begin{vmatrix} \mathbf{e}_{23} & \mathbf{e}_{31} & \mathbf{e}_{12}\\a_1 & a_2 & a_3\\b_1 & b_2 & b_3 \end{vmatrix}\,,$$

so are related by the Hodge dual:

$${\star} (\mathbf a \wedge \mathbf b ) = \mathbf {a \times b} \,,\quad {\star} (\mathbf {a \times b} ) = \mathbf a \wedge \mathbf b\,.$$

Bivectors have a number of advantages over axial vectors. They better disambiguate axial and polar vectors, that is the quantities represented by them, so it is clearer which operations are allowed and what their results are. For example, the inner product of a polar vector and an axial vector resulting from the cross product in the triple product should result in a pseudoscalar, a result which is more obvious if the calculation is framed as the exterior product of a vector and bivector. They generalise to other dimensions; in particular bivectors can be used to describe quantities like torque and angular momentum in two as well as three dimensions. Also, they closely match geometric intuition in a number of ways, as seen in the next section.

=== Geometric interpretation ===
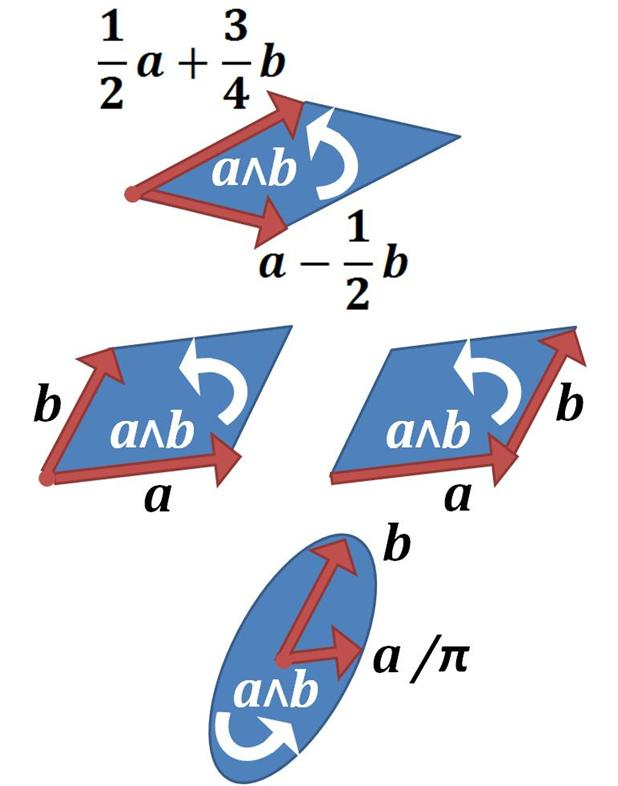
Parallel plane segments with the same orientation and area corresponding to the same bivector a ∧ b.

As suggested by their name and that of the algebra, bivectors have a natural geometric interpretation. This appies in any dimension number but is best illustrated in three, where parallels can be drawn with more familiar objects. In two dimensions the geometric interpretation is trivial, as the space is two-dimensional so has only one plane, and all bivectors are associated with it differing only by a scalar factor.

All bivectors can be interpreted as planes, or more precisely as directed plane segments. In three dimensions, there are three properties of a bivector that can be interpreted geometrically:

- The arrangement of the plane in space, precisely the attitude of the plane (or alternately the rotation or geometric orientation of the plane), is associated with the ratio of the bivector components. In particular, three basis bivectors, e_{23}, e_{31} and e_{12}, or scalar multiples of them, are associated with the yz-plane, zx-plane and xy-plane respectively.
- The magnitude of the bivector is associated with the signed area of the plane segment, regardless of its shape. It can even be represented in other ways, such as by an angular measure. But if the vectors are interpreted as lengths, the bivector is usually interpreted as an area with the same unit of measure.
- Like the direction of a vector, a plane associated with a bivector has a direction, a direction of being swept out, or a sense of rotation in the plane in one of two values, which may correspond to clockwise and counterclockwise when viewed from viewpoint not in the plane. This is associated with a change of sign in the bivector, that is, if the direction is reversed, the bivector is negated. Alternately if two bivectors have the same attitude and magnitude but opposite directions then one is the negative of the other.
- If imagined as a parallelogram, with the origin for two of its edge vectors at 0, then signed area is the determinant of the vectors' Cartesian coordinates (a_{x} b_{y} − b_{x}a_{y}).

The cross product a × b is orthogonal to the bivector a ∧ b.

In three dimensions, every bivector can be generated by the exterior product of two vectors. If the bivector B = a ∧ b then the magnitude of B is

$$|\mathbf{B}| = |\mathbf{a}| |\mathbf{b}|\sin\theta,$$

where θ is the angle between the vectors. This is the area of the parallelogram with edges a and b, as shown in the diagram. One interpretation is that the area is swept out by b as it moves along a. The exterior product is antisymmetric, so reversing the order of a and b to make a move along b results in a bivector with the opposite direction that is the negative of the first. The plane of bivector a ∧ b contains both a and b so they are both parallel to the plane.

Bivectors and axial vectors are related as being Hodge dual. In a real vector space, the Hodge dual relates the blade that represents a subspace to its orthogonal complement, so if a bivector represents a plane then the axial vector associated with it is simply the plane's surface normal. The plane has two normal sets of vbectors, one on each side, giving the two possible orientations for the plane and bivector.

Relationship between force F, torque τ, linear momentum p, and angular momentum L.

In three dimensions, Hodge duality relates the cross product to the exterior product. It can also be used to represent physical quantities, like torque and angular momentum. In vector algebra they are usually represented by pseudovectors that are perpendicular to the plane of the force, linear momentum or displacement that they are calculated from. But if a bivector is used instead, the plane is the plane of the bivector, so is a more natural way to represent the quantities and the way in which they act. Unlike the vector representation, it generalises to other dimensions.

The geometric product of two bivectors has a geometric interpretation. For non-zero bivectors A and B the product can be split into symmetric and antisymmetric parts as follows:

$$\mathbf{AB} = \mathbf{A} \cdot \mathbf{B} + \mathbf{A} \times \mathbf{B}.$$

Like vectors these have magnitudes |A · B| = |A| |B| cos θ and |A × B| = |A| |B| sin θ, where θ is the angle between the planes. In three dimensions it is the same as the angle between the normal vectors dual to the planes, and it generalises to some extent in higher dimensions.

Two bivectors, two of the non-parallel sides of a prism, being added to give a third bivector

Bivectors can be added together as areas. Given two non-zero bivectors B and C in three dimensions it is always possible to find a vector that is contained in both, a say, so the bivectors can be written as exterior products involving a:

$$\begin{align}\mathbf{B} &= \mathbf{a} \wedge \mathbf{b} \\ \mathbf{C} &= \mathbf{a} \wedge \mathbf{c}\end{align}$$

This can be interpreted geometrically as seen in the diagram: the two areas sum to give a third, with the three areas forming faces of a prism with a, b, c and b + c as edges. This corresponds to the two ways of calculating the area using the distributivity of the exterior product:

$$\begin{align} \mathbf{B} + \mathbf{C} &= \mathbf{a} \wedge \mathbf{b} + \mathbf{a} \wedge \mathbf{c} \\ &= \mathbf{a} \wedge (\mathbf{b} + \mathbf{c}).\end{align}$$

This only works in three dimensions as it is the only number of dimensions in which a vector that is parallel to both bivectors must exist. In a higher number of dimensions, bivectors generally are not associated with a single plane, or if they are (simple bivectors), two bivectors may have no vector in common, and so sum to a non-simple bivector.

== Four dimensions ==
In four dimensions, the basis elements for the space ⋀^{2}R^{4} of bivectors are (e_{12}, e_{13}, e_{14}, e_{23}, e_{24}, e_{34}), so a general bivector is of the form

$$\mathbf{A} = a_{12}\mathbf{e}_{12} + a_{13}\mathbf{e}_{13} + a_{14}\mathbf{e}_{14} + a_{23}\mathbf{e}_{23} + a_{24}\mathbf{e}_{24} + a_{34}\mathbf{e}_{34}.$$

=== Orthogonality ===
In four dimensions, the Hodge dual of a bivector is a bivector, and the space ⋀^{2}R^{4} is dual to itself. Normal vectors are not unique, instead every plane is orthogonal to all the vectors in its Hodge dual space. This can be used to partition the bivectors into two 'halves', in the following way. We have three pairs of orthogonal bivectors: (e_{12}, e_{34}), (e_{13}, e_{24}) and (e_{14}, e_{23}). There are four distinct ways of picking one bivector from each of the first two pairs, and once these first two are picked their sum yields the third bivector from the other pair. For example, (e_{12}, e_{13}, e_{14}) and (e_{23}, e_{24}, e_{34}).

=== Simple bivectors in 4D ===
In four dimensions bivectors are generated by the exterior product of vectors in R^{4}, but with one important difference from R^{3} and R^{2}. In four dimensions not all bivectors are simple. There are bivectors such as e_{12} + e_{34} that cannot be generated by the exterior product of two vectors. This also means they do not have a real, that is scalar, square. In this case

$$(\mathbf{e}_{12} + \mathbf{e}_{34})^2 =\mathbf{e}_{12} \mathbf{e}_{12} + \mathbf{e}_{12} \mathbf{e}_{34} + \mathbf{e}_{34} \mathbf{e}_{12} + \mathbf{e}_{34} \mathbf{e}_{34} = -2 + 2 \mathbf{e}_{1234}.$$

The element e_{1234} is the pseudoscalar in Cl_{4}, distinct from the scalar, so the square is non-scalar.

All bivectors in four dimensions can be generated using at most two exterior products and four vectors. The above bivector can be written as

$$\mathbf{e}_{12} + \mathbf{e}_{34} = \mathbf{e}_{1} \wedge \mathbf{e}_{2} + \mathbf{e}_{3} \wedge \mathbf{e}_{4}.$$

Similarly, every bivector can be written as the sum of two simple bivectors. It is useful to choose two orthogonal bivectors for this, and this is always possible to do. Moreover, for a generic bivector the choice of simple bivectors is unique, that is, there is only one way to decompose into orthogonal bivectors; the only exception is when the two orthogonal bivectors have equal magnitudes (as in the above example): in this case the decomposition is not unique. The decomposition is always unique in the case of simple bivectors, with the added bonus that one of the orthogonal parts is zero.

=== Rotations in R^{4} ===
As in three dimensions bivectors in four dimension generate rotations through the exponential map, and all rotations can be generated this way. As in three dimensions if B is a bivector then the rotor R is exp 1/2B and rotations are generated in the same way:

$$v' = RvR^{-1}.$$

A 3D projection of a tesseract performing an isoclinic rotation.

The rotations generated are more complex though. They can be categorised as follows:

simple rotations are those that fix a plane in 4D, and rotate by an angle "about" this plane.
double rotations have only one fixed point, the origin, and rotate through two angles about two orthogonal planes. In general the angles are different and the planes are uniquely specified
isoclinic rotations are double rotations where the angles of rotation are equal. In this case the planes about which the rotation is taking place are not unique.

These are generated by bivectors in a straightforward way. Simple rotations are generated by simple bivectors, with the fixed plane the dual or orthogonal to the plane of the bivector. The rotation can be said to take place about that plane, in the plane of the bivector. All other bivectors generate double rotations, with the two angles of the rotation equalling the magnitudes of the two simple bivectors that the non-simple bivector is composed of. Isoclinic rotations arise when these magnitudes are equal, in which case the decomposition into two simple bivectors is not unique.

Bivectors in general do not commute, but one exception is orthogonal bivectors and exponents of them. So if the bivector B = B_{1} + B_{2}, where B_{1} and B_{2} are orthogonal simple bivectors, is used to generate a rotation it decomposes into two simple rotations that commute as follows:

$$R = \exp(\tfrac{1}{2} (\mathbf{B}_1 + \mathbf{B}_2)) =  \exp(\tfrac{1}{2} \mathbf{B}_1)\,\exp(\tfrac{1}{2} \mathbf{B}_2) = \exp(\tfrac{1}{2} \mathbf{B}_2)\,\exp(\tfrac{1}{2} \mathbf{B}_1)$$

It is always possible to do this as all bivectors can be expressed as sums of orthogonal bivectors.

=== Spacetime rotations ===
Spacetime is a mathematical model for our universe used in special relativity. It consists of three space dimensions and one time dimension combined into a single four-dimensional space. It is naturally described using geometric algebra and bivectors, with the Euclidean metric replaced by a Minkowski metric. That algebra is identical to that of Euclidean space, except the signature is changed, so

$$\mathbf{e}_i^2 = \begin{cases} 1,  & i = 1, 2, 3 \\  -1, & i = 4 \end{cases}$$

(Note the order and indices above are not universal – here e_{4} is the time-like dimension). The geometric algebra is Cl_{3,1}(R), and the subspace of bivectors is ⋀^{2}R^{3,1}.

The simple bivectors are of two types. The simple bivectors e_{23}, e_{31} and e_{12} have negative squares and span the bivectors of the three-dimensional subspace corresponding to Euclidean space, R^{3}. These bivectors generate ordinary rotations in R^{3}.

The simple bivectors e_{14}, e_{24} and e_{34} have positive squares and as planes span a space dimension and the time dimension. These also generate rotations through the exponential map, but instead of trigonometric functions, hyperbolic functions are needed, which generates a rotor as follows:

$$\exp{\tfrac{1}{2}{\boldsymbol{\Omega}\theta}} = \cosh{\tfrac{1}{2} \theta} + \boldsymbol{\Omega}\sinh{\tfrac{1}{2} \theta},$$

where Ω is the bivector (e_{14}, etc.), identified via the metric with an antisymmetric linear transformation of R^{3,1}. These are Lorentz boosts, expressed in a particularly compact way, using the same kind of algebra as in R^{3} and R^{4}.

In general all spacetime rotations are generated from bivectors through the exponential map, that is, a general rotor generated by bivector A is of the form

$$R = \exp{\tfrac{1}{2} \mathbf{A}}.$$

The set of all rotations in spacetime form the Lorentz group, and from them most of the consequences of special relativity can be deduced. More generally this show how transformations in Euclidean space and spacetime can all be described using the same kind of algebra.

=== Maxwell's equations ===
(Note: in this section traditional 3-vectors are indicated by lines over the symbols and spacetime vector and bivectors by bold symbols, with the vectors J and A exceptionally in uppercase)

Maxwell's equations are used in physics to describe the relationship between electric and magnetic fields. Normally given as four differential equations they have a particularly compact form when the fields are expressed as a spacetime bivector from ⋀^{2}R^{3,1}. If the electric and magnetic fields in R^{3} are E̅ and B̅ then the electromagnetic bivector is

$$\mathbf{F} = \frac{1}{c}\overline{E}\mathbf{e}_4 + \overline{B}\mathbf{e}_{123},$$

where e_{4} is again the basis vector for the time-like dimension and c is the speed of light. The product B̅e_{123} yields the bivector that is Hodge dual to B̅ in three dimensions, as discussed above, while E̅e_{4} as a product of orthogonal vectors is also bivector-valued. As a whole it is the electromagnetic tensor expressed more compactly as a bivector, and is used as follows. First it is related to the 4-current J, a vector quantity given by

$$\mathbf{J} = \overline{j} + c\rho\mathbf{e}_4,$$

where j̅ is current density and ρ is charge density. They are related by a differential operator ∂, which is

$$\partial = \nabla - \mathbf{e}_4\frac{1}{c}\frac{\partial}{\partial t}.$$

The operator ∇ is a differential operator in geometric algebra, acting on the space dimensions and given by ∇M = ∇·M + ∇∧M. When applied to vectors ∇·M is the divergence and ∇∧M is the curl but with a bivector rather than vector result, that is dual in three dimensions to the curl. For general quantity M they act as grade lowering and raising differential operators. In particular if M is a scalar then this operator is just the gradient, and it can be thought of as a geometric algebraic del operator.

Together these can be used to give a particularly compact form for Maxwell's equations with sources:

$$\partial\mathbf{F} = \mathbf{J}.$$

This equation, when decomposed according to geometric algebra, using geometric products which have both grade raising and grade lowering effects, is equivalent to Maxwell's four equations. It is also related to the electromagnetic four-potential, a vector A given by

$$\mathbf{A} = \overline{A} + \frac{1}{c}V\mathbf{e}_4,$$

where A̅ is the vector magnetic potential and V is the electric potential. It is related to the electromagnetic bivector as follows

$$\partial\mathbf{A} = -\mathbf{F},$$

using the same differential operator ∂.

== Higher dimensions ==
As has been suggested in earlier sections much of geometric algebra generalises well into higher dimensions. The geometric algebra for the real space R^{n} is Cl_{n}(R), and the subspace of bivectors is ⋀^{2}R^{n}.

The number of simple bivectors needed to form a general bivector rises with the dimension, so for n odd it is (n − 1) / 2, for n even it is n / 2. So for four and five dimensions only two simple bivectors are needed but three are required for six and seven dimensions. For example, in six dimensions with standard basis (e_{1}, e_{2}, e_{3}, e_{4}, e_{5}, e_{6}) the bivector

$$\mathbf{e}_{12} + \mathbf{e}_{34} + \mathbf{e}_{56}$$

is the sum of three simple bivectors but no less. As in four dimensions it is always possible to find orthogonal simple bivectors for this sum.

=== Rotations in higher dimensions ===
As in three and four dimensions rotors are generated by the exponential map, so

$$\exp{\tfrac{1}{2} \mathbf{B}}$$

is the rotor generated by bivector B. Simple rotations, that take place in a plane of rotation around a fixed blade of dimension (n − 2) are generated by simple bivectors, while other bivectors generate more complex rotations which can be described in terms of the simple bivectors they are sums of, each related to a plane of rotation. All bivectors can be expressed as the sum of orthogonal and commutative simple bivectors, so rotations can always be decomposed into a set of commutative rotations about the planes associated with these bivectors. The group of the rotors in n dimensions is the spin group, Spin(n).

One notable feature, related to the number of simple bivectors and so rotation planes, is that in odd dimensions every rotation has a fixed axis – it is misleading to call it an axis of rotation as in higher dimensions rotations are taking place in multiple planes orthogonal to it. This is related to bivectors, as bivectors in odd dimensions decompose into the same number of bivectors as the even dimension below, so have the same number of planes, but one extra dimension. As each plane generates rotations in two dimensions in odd dimensions there must be one dimension, that is an axis, that is not being rotated.

Bivectors are also related to the rotation matrix in n dimensions. As in three dimensions the characteristic equation of the matrix can be solved to find the eigenvalues. In odd dimensions this has one real root, with eigenvector the fixed axis, and in even dimensions it has no real roots, so either all or all but one of the roots are complex conjugate pairs. Each pair is associated with a simple component of the bivector associated with the rotation. In particular, the log of each pair is the magnitude up to a sign, while eigenvectors generated from the roots are parallel to and so can be used to generate the bivector. In general the eigenvalues and bivectors are unique, and the set of eigenvalues gives the full decomposition into simple bivectors; if roots are repeated then the decomposition of the bivector into simple bivectors is not unique.

== Projective geometry ==
Geometric algebra can be applied to projective geometry in a straightforward way. The geometric algebra used is Cl_{n}(R), n ≥ 3, the algebra of the real vector space R^{n}. This is used to describe objects in the real projective space RP^{n−1}. The non-zero vectors in Cl_{n}(R) or R^{n} are associated with points in the projective space so vectors that differ only by a scale factor, so their exterior product is zero, map to the same point. Non-zero simple bivectors in ⋀^{2}R^{n} represent lines in RP^{n−1}, with bivectors differing only by a (positive or negative) scale factor representing the same line.

A description of the projective geometry can be constructed in the geometric algebra using basic operations. For example, given two distinct points in RP^{n−1} represented by vectors a and b the line containing them is given by a ∧ b (or b ∧ a). Two lines intersect in a point if A ∧ B = 0 for their bivectors A and B. This point is given by the vector

$$\mathbf{p} = \mathbf{A} \lor \mathbf{B} = (\mathbf{A} \times \mathbf{B}) J^{-1}.$$

The operation "∨" is the meet, which can be defined as above in terms of the join, J = A ∧ B for non-zero A ∧ B. Using these operations projective geometry can be formulated in terms of geometric algebra. For example, given a third (non-zero) bivector C the point p lies on the line given by C if and only if

$$\mathbf{p} \land \mathbf{C} = 0.$$

So the condition for the lines given by A, B and C to be collinear is

$$(\mathbf{A} \lor \mathbf{B}) \land \mathbf{C} = 0,$$

which in Cl_{3}(R) and RP^{2} simplifies to

$$\langle \mathbf{ABC} \rangle = 0,$$

where the angle brackets denote the scalar part of the geometric product. In the same way all projective space operations can be written in terms of geometric algebra, with bivectors representing general lines in projective space, so the whole geometry can be developed using geometric algebra.

=== Tensors and matrices ===
As noted above a bivector can be written as a skew-symmetric matrix, which through the exponential map generates a rotation matrix that describes the same rotation as the rotor, also generated by the exponential map but applied to the vector. But it is also used with other bivectors such as the angular velocity tensor and the electromagnetic tensor, respectively a 3×3 and 4×4 skew-symmetric matrix or tensor.

Real bivectors in ⋀^{2}R^{n} are isomorphic to n × n skew-symmetric matrices, or alternately to antisymmetric tensors of degree 2 on R^{n}. While bivectors are isomorphic to vectors (via the dual) in three dimensions they can be represented by skew-symmetric matrices in any dimension. This is useful for relating bivectors to problems described by matrices, so they can be re-cast in terms of bivectors, given a geometric interpretation, then often solved more easily or related geometrically to other bivector problems.

More generally, every real geometric algebra is isomorphic to a matrix algebra. These contain bivectors as a subspace, though often in a way which is not especially useful. These matrices are mainly of interest as a way of classifying Clifford algebras.

== See also ==
- Dyadics
- Multivector
- Multilinear algebra

== General references ==
- Dorst, Leo; Fontijne, Daniel; Mann, Stephen (2009). "§ 2.3.3 Visualizing bivectors". Geometric Algebra for Computer Science: An Object-Oriented Approach to Geometry (2nd ed.). Morgan Kaufmann. p. 31 ff. ISBN 978-0-12-374942-0.
- Whitney, Hassler (1957). Geometric Integration Theory. Princeton: Princeton University Press. Reprinted, Dover Publications, 2005, ISBN 978-0-486-44583-0.
- Lounesto, Pertti (2001). Clifford algebras and spinors. Cambridge: Cambridge University Press. ISBN 978-0-521-00551-7.
- Chris Doran & Anthony Lasenby (2003). "§ 1.6 The outer product". Geometric Algebra for Physicists. Cambridge: Cambridge University Press. p. 11 et seq. ISBN 978-0-521-71595-9.
