= 3D rotation group =

Group of rotations in 3 dimensions

In mechanics and geometry, the 3D rotation group, often denoted SO(3), is the group of all rotations about the origin of three-dimensional Euclidean space $\R^3$ under the operation of composition, which combines two rotations by performing one after the other.

A rotation about a point is a transformation that preserves that point, while also preserving the Euclidean distance between any two points (so it is an isometry), and orientation (i.e., handedness of space). Composing two rotations results in another rotation, every rotation has a unique inverse rotation, and the identity map satisfies the definition of a rotation. Owing to the above properties (along composite rotations' associative property), the set of all rotations is a group under composition.

Every non-trivial rotation is determined by its axis of rotation (a line through the origin) and its angle of rotation. Rotations are not commutative (for example, rotating R 90° in the x-y plane followed by S 90° in the y-z plane is not the same as S followed by R), making the 3D rotation group a nonabelian group. Moreover, the rotation group has a natural structure as a manifold for which the group operations are smoothly differentiable, so it is in fact a Lie group. It is compact and has dimension 3.

Rotations are linear transformations of $\R^3$ and can therefore be represented by matrices once a basis (the three orthogonal unit vectors of the x, y, and z axes) of $\R^3$ has been chosen. Specifically, if we choose an orthonormal basis of $\R^3$, every rotation is described by an orthogonal 3 × 3 matrix (i.e., a 3 × 3 matrix with real entries which, when multiplied by its transpose, results in the identity matrix) with determinant 1. The group SO(3) can therefore be identified with the group of these matrices under matrix multiplication. These matrices are known as "special orthogonal matrices", explaining the notation SO(3).

The group SO(3) is used to describe the possible rotational symmetries of an object, as well as the possible orientations of an object in space. Its representations are important in physics, where they give rise to the elementary particles of integer spin.

== Length and angle ==
Besides just preserving length, rotations also preserve the angles between vectors. This follows from the fact that the standard dot product between two vectors u and v can be written purely in terms of length (see the law of cosines):
$$\mathbf{u} \cdot \mathbf{v} = \tfrac{1}{2} \left(\|\mathbf{u} + \mathbf{v}\|^2 - \|\mathbf{u}\|^2 - \|\mathbf{v}\|^2\right).$$

It follows that every length-preserving linear transformation in $\R^3$ preserves the dot product, and thus the angle between vectors. Rotations are often defined as linear transformations that preserve the inner product on $\R^3$, which is equivalent to requiring them to preserve length. See classical group for a treatment of this more general approach, where SO(3) appears as a special case.

== Orthogonal and rotation matrices ==
Every rotation maps an orthonormal basis of $\R^3$ to another orthonormal basis. Like any linear transformation of finite-dimensional vector spaces, a rotation can always be represented by a matrix. Let R be a given rotation. With respect to the standard basis e_{1}, e_{2}, e_{3} of $\R^3$ the columns of R are given by (Re_{1}, Re_{2}, Re_{3}). Since the standard basis is orthonormal, and since R preserves angles and length, the columns of R form another orthonormal basis. This orthonormality condition can be expressed in the form

$$R^\mathsf{T}R = RR^\mathsf{T} = I,$$

where R^{T} denotes the transpose of R and I is the 3 × 3 identity matrix. Matrices for which this property holds are called orthogonal matrices. The group of all 3 × 3 orthogonal matrices is denoted O(3), and consists of all proper and improper rotations.

In addition to preserving length, proper rotations must also preserve orientation. A matrix will preserve or reverse orientation according to whether the determinant of the matrix is positive or negative. For an orthogonal matrix R, note that det R^{T} = det R implies (det R)^{2} = 1, so that det R = ±1. The subgroup of orthogonal matrices with determinant +1 is called the special orthogonal group, denoted SO(3).

Thus every rotation can be represented uniquely by an orthogonal matrix with unit determinant. Moreover, since composition of rotations corresponds to matrix multiplication, the rotation group is isomorphic to the special orthogonal group SO(3).

Improper rotations correspond to orthogonal matrices with determinant −1, and they do not form a group because the product of two improper rotations is a proper rotation.

== Group structure ==
The rotation group is a group under function composition (or equivalently the product of linear transformations). It is a subgroup of the general linear group consisting of all invertible linear transformations of the real 3-space $\R^3$.

Furthermore, the rotation group is nonabelian. That is, the order in which rotations are composed makes a difference. For example, a quarter turn around the positive x-axis followed by a quarter turn around the positive y-axis is a different rotation than the one obtained by first rotating around y and then x.

The orthogonal group, consisting of all proper and improper rotations, is generated by reflections. Every proper rotation is the composition of two reflections, a special case of the Cartan–Dieudonné theorem.

=== Complete classification of finite subgroups ===
The finite subgroups of $\mathrm{SO}(3)$ are completely classified.

Every finite subgroup is isomorphic to either an element of one of two countably infinite families of planar isometries: the cyclic groups $C_n$ or the dihedral groups $D_{2n}$, or to one of three other groups: the tetrahedral group $\cong A_4$, the octahedral group $\cong S_4$, or the icosahedral group $\cong A_5$.

== Axis of rotation ==
Every nontrivial proper rotation in 3 dimensions fixes a unique 1-dimensional linear subspace of $\R^3$ which is called the axis of rotation (this is Euler's rotation theorem). Each such rotation acts as an ordinary 2-dimensional rotation in the plane orthogonal to this axis. Since every 2-dimensional rotation can be represented by an angle φ, an arbitrary 3-dimensional rotation can be specified by an axis of rotation together with an angle of rotation about this axis. (Technically, one needs to specify an orientation for the axis and whether the rotation is taken to be clockwise or counterclockwise with respect to this orientation).

For example, counterclockwise rotation about the positive z-axis by angle φ is given by

$$R_z(\phi) = \begin{bmatrix}\cos\phi & -\sin\phi & 0 \\ \sin\phi & \cos\phi & 0 \\ 0 & 0 & 1\end{bmatrix}.$$

Given a unit vector n in $\R^3$ and an angle φ, let R(φ, n) represent a counterclockwise rotation about the axis through n (with orientation determined by n). Then

- R(0, n) is the identity transformation for any n
- R(φ, n) = R(−φ, −n)
- R(π + φ, n) = R(π − φ, −n).

Using these properties one can show that any rotation can be represented by a unique angle φ in the range 0 ≤ φ ≤ π and a unit vector n such that

- n is arbitrary if φ = 0
- n is unique if 0 < φ < π
- n is unique up to a sign if φ = π (that is, the rotations R(π, ±n) are identical).

In the next section, this representation of rotations is used to identify SO(3) topologically with three-dimensional real projective space.

== Topology ==
Consider the solid ball in $\R^3$ of radius π (that is, all points of $\R^3$ of distance π or less from the origin). Given the above, for every point in this ball there is a rotation, with axis through the point and the origin, and rotation angle equal to the distance of the point from the origin. The identity rotation corresponds to the point at the center of the ball. Rotations through an angle 𝜃 between 0 and π (not including either) are on the same axis at the same distance. Rotation through angles between 0 and −π correspond to the point on the same axis and distance from the origin but on the opposite side of the origin. The one remaining issue is that the two rotations through π and through −π are the same. So we identify (or "glue together") antipodal points on the surface of the ball. After this identification, we arrive at a topological space homeomorphic to the rotation group.

Indeed, the ball with antipodal surface points identified is a smooth manifold, and this manifold is diffeomorphic to the rotation group. It is also diffeomorphic to the real 3-dimensional projective space $\mathbb{P}^3(\R)$, so the latter can also serve as a topological model for the rotation group.

These identifications illustrate that SO(3) is connected but not simply connected. As to the latter, in the ball with antipodal surface points identified, consider the path running from the "north pole" straight through the interior down to the south pole. This is a closed loop, since the north pole and the south pole are identified. This loop cannot be shrunk to a point, since no matter how it is deformed, the start and end point have to remain antipodal, or else the loop will "break open". In terms of rotations, this loop represents a continuous sequence of rotations about the z-axis starting (by example) at the identity (center of the ball), through the south pole, jumping to the north pole and ending again at the identity rotation (i.e., a series of rotation through an angle φ where φ runs from 0 to 2π).

Surprisingly, running through the path twice, i.e., running from the north pole down to the south pole, jumping back to the north pole (using the fact that north and south poles are identified), and then again running from the north pole down to the south pole, so that φ runs from 0 to 4π, gives a closed loop which can be shrunk to a single point: first move the paths continuously to the ball's surface, still connecting north pole to south pole twice. The second path can then be mirrored over to the antipodal side without changing the path at all. Now we have an ordinary closed loop on the surface of the ball, connecting the north pole to itself along a great circle. This circle can be shrunk to the north pole without problems. The plate trick and similar tricks demonstrate this practically.

The same argument can be performed in general, and it shows that the fundamental group of SO(3) is the cyclic group of order 2 (a group with two elements).

The universal cover of SO(3) is a Lie group called Spin(3). The group Spin(3) is isomorphic to the special unitary group SU(2); it is also diffeomorphic to the unit 3-sphere S^{3} and can be understood as the group of versors (quaternions with absolute value 1). The connection between quaternions and rotations, commonly exploited in computer graphics, is explained in quaternions and spatial rotations. The map from S^{3} onto SO(3) that identifies antipodal points of S^{3} is a surjective homomorphism of Lie groups, with kernel {±1}. Topologically, this map is a two-to-one covering map.

In physics applications, especially quantum mechanics, this double cover allows for the existence of objects known as spinors, and is an important tool in the development of the spin–statistics theorem. (See also Spinors in three dimensions.)

== Connection between SO(3) and SU(2) ==
In this section, we give two different constructions of a two-to-one and surjective homomorphism of SU(2) onto SO(3).

=== Using quaternions of unit norm ===
The group SU(2) is isomorphic to the quaternions of unit norm via a map given by
$$q = a\mathbf{1} + b\mathbf{i} + c\mathbf{j} + d\mathbf{k} = \alpha + \beta \mathbf{j} \leftrightarrow \begin{bmatrix}\alpha & \beta \\ -\overline\beta & \overline \alpha\end{bmatrix} = U$$
restricted to $a^2+ b^2 + c^2 + d^2 = |\alpha|^2 +|\beta|^2 = 1$ where $q \in \mathbb{H}$, $a, b, c, d \in \R$, $U \in \operatorname{SU}(2)$, and $\alpha = a+bi \in\mathbb{C}$, $\beta = c+di \in \mathbb{C}$.

Let us now identify $\R^3$ with the span of $\mathbf{i},\mathbf{j},\mathbf{k}$. One can then verify that if $v$ is in $\R^3$ and $q$ is a unit quaternion, then
$$qvq^{-1}\in \R^3.$$

Furthermore, the map $v\mapsto qvq^{-1}$ is a rotation of $\R^3.$ Moreover, $(-q)v(-q)^{-1}$ is the same as $qvq^{-1}$. This means that there is a 2:1 homomorphism from quaternions of unit norm to the 3D rotation group SO(3).

One can work this homomorphism out explicitly: the unit quaternion, q, with
$$\begin{align}
q &= w + x\mathbf{i} + y\mathbf{j} + z\mathbf{k} , \\
1 &= w^2 + x^2 + y^2 + z^2 ,
\end{align}$$
is mapped to the rotation matrix
$$Q = \begin{bmatrix}
1 - 2 y^2 - 2 z^2 & 2 x y - 2 z w & 2 x z + 2 y w \\
2 x y + 2 z w & 1 - 2 x^2 - 2 z^2 & 2 y z - 2 x w \\
2 x z - 2 y w & 2 y z + 2 x w & 1 - 2 x^2 - 2 y^2
\end{bmatrix}.$$

This is a rotation around the vector (x, y, z) by an angle 2θ, where cos θ = w and |sin θ| = ‖(x, y, z)‖. The proper sign for sin θ is implied, once the signs of the axis components are fixed. The 2:1-nature is apparent since both q and −q map to the same Q.

=== Using Möbius transformations ===
Stereographic projection from the sphere of radius 1/2 from the north pole (x, y, z) = (0, 0, 1/2) onto the plane M given by z = −1/2 coordinatized by (ξ, η), here shown in cross section.

The general reference for this section is Gelfand, Minlos & Shapiro (1963). The points P on the sphere

$$\mathbf{S} = \left \{(x,y,z)\in\R^3: x^2 +y^2 +z^2 = \tfrac{1}{4} \right \}$$

can, barring the north pole N, be put into one-to-one bijection with points S(P) = P' on the plane M defined by z = −1/2, see figure. The map S is called stereographic projection.

Let the coordinates on M be (ξ, η). The line L passing through N and P can be parametrized as

$$L(t) = N + t(N - P) = \left(0,0,\tfrac{1}{2}\right) + t \left ( \left(0,0,\tfrac{1}{2}\right) - (x, y, z) \right ), \quad t\in \R.$$

Demanding that the z-coordinate of $L(t_0)$ equals −1/2, one finds

$$t_0 = \frac1{z-\frac12}.$$

We have $L(t_0)=(\xi,\eta,-1/2).$ Hence the map

$$\begin{cases} S:\mathbf{S} \to M \\ P = (x,y,z) \longmapsto P'= (\xi, \eta) = \left(\dfrac{x}{\tfrac{1}{2} - z}, \dfrac{y}{\tfrac{1}{2} - z}\right) \equiv \zeta = \xi + i\eta \end{cases}$$

where, for later convenience, the plane M is identified with the complex plane $\Complex.$

For the inverse, write L as

$$L = N + s(P'-N) = \left(0,0,\tfrac{1}{2}\right) + s\left( \left(\xi, \eta, -\tfrac{1}{2}\right) - \left(0,0,\tfrac{1}{2}\right)\right),$$

and demand x^{2} + y^{2} + z^{2} = 1/4 to find s = 1/(1 + ξ^{2} + η^{2}) and thus

$$\begin{cases} S^{-1}:M \to \mathbf{S} \\ P'= (\xi, \eta) \longmapsto P = (x,y,z) = \left(\dfrac{\xi}{1 + \xi^2 + \eta^2}, \dfrac{\eta}{1 + \xi^2 + \eta^2}, \dfrac{-1 + \xi^2 + \eta^2}{2 + 2\xi^2 + 2\eta^2}\right) \end{cases}$$

If g ∈ SO(3) is a rotation, then it will take points on S to points on S by its standard action Π_{s}(g) on the embedding space $\R^3.$ By composing this action with S one obtains a transformation S ∘ Π_{s}(g) ∘ S^{−1} of M,

$$\zeta=P' \longmapsto P \longmapsto \Pi_s(g)P = gP \longmapsto S(gP) \equiv \Pi_u(g)\zeta = \zeta'.$$

Thus Π_{u}(g) is a transformation of $\Complex$ associated to the transformation Π_{s}(g) of $\R^3$.

It turns out that g ∈ SO(3) represented in this way by Π_{u}(g) can be expressed as a matrix Π_{u}(g) ∈ SU(2) (where the notation is recycled to use the same name for the matrix as for the transformation of $\Complex$ it represents). To identify this matrix, consider first a rotation g_{φ} about the z-axis through an angle φ,

$$\begin{align}
x' &= x\cos \phi - y \sin \phi,\\
y' &= x\sin \phi + y \cos \phi,\\
z' &= z.
\end{align}$$

Hence

$$\zeta' = \frac{x' + iy'}{\tfrac{1}{2} - z'} = \frac{e^{i\phi}(x + iy)}{\tfrac{1}{2} - z} = e^{i\phi}\zeta = \frac{e^{\frac{i\phi}{2}} \zeta + 0 }{0 \zeta + e^{-\frac{i\phi}{2}}},$$

which, unsurprisingly, is a rotation in the complex plane. In an analogous way, if g_{θ} is a rotation about the x-axis through an angle θ, then

$$w' = e^{i\theta}w, \quad w = \frac{y + iz}{\frac{1}{2} - x},$$

which, after a little algebra, becomes

$$\zeta' = \frac{\cos \frac{\theta}{2}\zeta +i\sin \frac{\theta}{2} }{i \sin\frac{\theta}{2}\zeta + \cos\frac{\theta}{2}}.$$

These two rotations, $g_{\phi}, g_{\theta},$ thus correspond to bilinear transforms of R^{2} ≃ C ≃ M, namely, they are examples of Möbius transformations.

A general Möbius transformation is given by

$$\zeta' = \frac{\alpha \zeta + \beta}{\gamma \zeta + \delta}, \quad \alpha\delta - \beta\gamma \ne 0.$$

The rotations, $g_{\phi}, g_{\theta}$ generate all of SO(3) and the composition rules of the Möbius transformations show that any composition of $g_{\phi}, g_{\theta}$ translates to the corresponding composition of Möbius transformations. The Möbius transformations can be represented by matrices

$$\begin{pmatrix}\alpha & \beta\\ \gamma & \delta\end{pmatrix}, \qquad \alpha\delta - \beta\gamma = 1,$$

since a common factor of α, β, γ, δ cancels.

For the same reason, the matrix is not uniquely defined since multiplication by −I has no effect on either the determinant or the Möbius transformation. The composition law of Möbius transformations follow that of the corresponding matrices. The conclusion is that each Möbius transformation corresponds to two matrices g, −g ∈ SL(2, C).

Using this correspondence one may write

$$\begin{align}
\Pi_u(g_\phi) &= \Pi_u\left[\begin{pmatrix}
\cos \phi & -\sin \phi & 0\\
\sin \phi & \cos \phi & 0\\
0 & 0 & 1
\end{pmatrix}\right] = \pm
\begin{pmatrix}
e^{i\frac{\phi}{2}} & 0\\
0 & e^{-i\frac{\phi}{2}}
\end{pmatrix},\\
\Pi_u(g_\theta) &= \Pi_u\left[\begin{pmatrix}
1 & 0 & 0\\
0 & \cos \theta & -\sin \theta\\
0 & \sin \theta & \cos \theta
\end{pmatrix}\right] = \pm
\begin{pmatrix}
\cos\frac{\theta}{2} & i\sin\frac{\theta}{2}\\
i\sin\frac{\theta}{2} & \cos\frac{\theta}{2}
\end{pmatrix}.
\end{align}$$

These matrices are unitary and thus Π_{u}(SO(3)) ⊂ SU(2) ⊂ SL(2, C). In terms of Euler angles (Note: This is effected by first applying a rotation $g_{\theta}$ through φ about the z-axis to take the x-axis to the line L, the intersection between the planes xy and x'y', the latter being the rotated xy-plane. Then rotate with $g_{\theta}$ through θ about L to obtain the new z-axis from the old one, and finally rotate by $g_{\psi}$ through an angle ψ about the new z-axis, where ψ is the angle between L and the new x-axis. In the equation, $g_{\theta}$ and $g_{\psi}$ are expressed in a temporary rotated basis at each step, which is seen from their simple form. To transform these back to the original basis, observe that $\mathbf{g}_{\theta} = g_{\phi}g_{\theta}g_{\phi}^{-1}.$ Here boldface means that the rotation is expressed in the original basis. Likewise, $$\mathbf{g}_{\psi} = g_{\phi}g_{\theta}g_{\phi}^{-1} g_{\phi} g_{\psi} \left [ g_{\phi}g_{\theta}g_{\phi}^{-1} g_{\phi} \right ]^{-1}.$$ Thus $$\mathbf{g}_{\psi}\mathbf{g}_{\theta}\mathbf{g}_{\phi} = g_{\phi}g_{\theta}g_{\phi}^{-1} g_{\phi}g_{\psi} \left [g_{\phi} g_{\theta} g_{\phi}^{-1} g_{\phi} \right ]^{-1} * g_{\phi}g_{\theta}g_{\phi}^{-1}* g_{\phi} = g_{\phi}g_{\theta}g_{\psi}.$$) one finds for a general rotation

$$\begin{align} g(\phi, \theta, \psi) = g_\phi g_\theta g_\psi &= \begin{pmatrix} \cos \phi & -\sin \phi & 0\\ \sin \phi &  \cos \phi & 0\\ 0 &          0 & 1 \end{pmatrix}\begin{pmatrix} 1 &           0 &            0\\ 0 & \cos \theta & -\sin \theta\\ 0 & \sin \theta &  \cos \theta \end{pmatrix}\begin{pmatrix} \cos \psi & -\sin \psi & 0\\ \sin \psi &  \cos \psi & 0\\ 0 &          0 & 1 \end{pmatrix}\\ &= \begin{pmatrix} \cos\phi\cos\psi - \cos\theta\sin\phi\sin\psi & -\cos\phi\sin\psi - \cos\theta\sin\phi\cos\psi & \sin\phi\sin\theta \\ \sin\phi\cos\psi + \cos\theta\cos\phi\sin\psi & -\sin\phi\sin\psi + \cos\theta\cos\phi\cos\psi & -\cos\phi\sin\theta\\ \sin\psi\sin\theta & \cos\psi\sin\theta & \cos\theta \end{pmatrix}, \end{align}$$	1

one has

$$\begin{align}\Pi_u(g(\phi, \theta, \psi)) &= \pm \begin{pmatrix} e^{i\frac{\phi}{2}} & 0\\ 0 & e^{-i\frac{\phi}{2}} \end{pmatrix} \begin{pmatrix} \cos\frac{\theta}{2} & -i\sin\frac{\theta}{2}\\ i\sin\frac{\theta}{2} & \cos\frac{\theta}{2} \end{pmatrix} \begin{pmatrix} e^{i\frac{\psi}{2}} & 0\\ 0 & e^{-i\frac{\psi}{2}} \end{pmatrix}\\ &= \pm \begin{pmatrix} \cos\frac{\theta}{2}e^{i\frac{\phi + \psi}{2}} & -i\sin\frac{\theta}{2}e^{i\frac{\phi - \psi}{2}}\\ i\sin\frac{\theta}{2}e^{-i\frac{\phi - \psi}{2}} & \cos\frac{\theta}{2}e^{-i\frac{\phi + \psi}{2}} \end{pmatrix}. \end{align}$$	2

For the converse, consider a general matrix

$$\pm\Pi_u(g_{\alpha,\beta}) = \pm\begin{pmatrix} \alpha & \beta\\ -\overline{\beta} & \overline{\alpha} \end{pmatrix} \in \operatorname{SU}(2).$$

Make the substitutions

$$\begin{align}
\cos\tfrac\theta2 &= |\alpha|,    &  \sin\tfrac\theta2 &= |\beta|,    & (0 \le \theta \le \pi),\\
\tfrac12(\phi + \psi) &= \arg \alpha, & \tfrac12(\psi - \phi) &= \arg \beta. &
\end{align}$$

With the substitutions, Π(g_{α, β}) assumes the form of the right hand side (RHS) of (2), which corresponds under Π_{u} to a matrix on the form of the RHS of (1) with the same φ, θ, ψ. In terms of the complex parameters α, β,

$$g_{\alpha,\beta} = \begin{pmatrix}
\frac{1}{2}\left( \alpha^2 - \beta^2 + \overline{\alpha^2} - \overline{\beta^2}\right) &
\frac{i}{2}\left(-\alpha^2 - \beta^2 + \overline{\alpha^2} + \overline{\beta^2}\right) &
-\alpha\beta - \overline{\alpha}\overline{\beta}\\
\frac{i}{2}\left(\alpha^2 - \beta^2 - \overline{\alpha^2} + \overline{\beta^2}\right) &
\frac{1}{2}\left(\alpha^2 + \beta^2 + \overline{\alpha^2} + \overline{\beta^2}\right) &
-i\left(+\alpha\beta - \overline{\alpha}\overline{\beta}\right)\\
\alpha\overline{\beta}  + \overline{\alpha}\beta &
i\left(-\alpha\overline{\beta}  + \overline{\alpha}\beta\right) &
\alpha\overline{\alpha} - \beta\overline{\beta}
\end{pmatrix}.$$

To verify this, substitute for α. β the elements of the matrix on the RHS of (2). After some manipulation, the matrix assumes the form of the RHS of (1).

It is clear from the explicit form in terms of Euler angles that the map

$$\begin{cases}
p:\operatorname{SU}(2) \to \operatorname{SO}(3)\\
\pm \Pi_u(g_{\alpha \beta}) \mapsto g_{\alpha \beta}
\end{cases}$$

just described is a smooth, 2:1 and surjective group homomorphism. It is hence an explicit description of the universal covering space of SO(3) from the universal covering group SU(2).

== Lie algebra ==
Associated with every Lie group is its Lie algebra, a linear space of the same dimension as the Lie group, closed under a bilinear alternating product called the Lie bracket. The Lie algebra of $\operatorname{SO}(3)$ is denoted by $\mathfrak{so}(3)$ and consists of all skew-symmetric 3 × 3 matrices. This may be seen by differentiating the orthogonality condition, $A^TA=I,\ A\in\operatorname{SO}(3)$. (Note: For an alternative derivation of $\mathfrak{so}(3)$, see Classical group.) The Lie bracket of two elements of $\mathfrak{so}(3)$ is, as for the Lie algebra of every matrix group, given by the matrix commutator, $[A_1,A_2]=A_1A_2-A_2A_1$, which is again a skew-symmetric matrix. The Lie algebra bracket captures the essence of the Lie group product in a sense made precise by the Baker–Campbell–Hausdorff formula.

The elements of $\mathfrak{so}(3)$ are the "infinitesimal generators" of rotations, i.e., they are the elements of the tangent space of the manifold $\operatorname{SO}(3)$ at the identity element. If $R(\phi, \boldsymbol{n})$ denotes a counterclockwise rotation with angle $\phi$ about the axis specified by the unit vector $\boldsymbol{n},$ then

$$\forall \boldsymbol{u} \in \R^3: \qquad \left. \frac{\operatorname{d}}{\operatorname{d}\phi} \right|_{\phi=0} R(\phi,\boldsymbol{n}) \boldsymbol{u} = \boldsymbol{n} \times \boldsymbol{u}.$$

This can be used to show that the Lie algebra $\mathfrak{so}(3)$ (with commutator) is isomorphic to the Lie algebra $\R^3$ (with cross product). Under this isomorphism, an Euler vector $\boldsymbol{\omega}\in\R^3$ corresponds to the linear map $\widetilde{\boldsymbol{\omega}}$ defined by $\widetilde{\boldsymbol{\omega}}(\boldsymbol{u}) = \boldsymbol{\omega}\times\boldsymbol{u}.$

In more detail, most often a suitable basis for $\mathfrak{so}(3)$ as a 3-dimensional vector space is

$$\boldsymbol{L}_x = \begin{bmatrix}0&0&0\\0&0&-1\\0&1&0\end{bmatrix}, \quad
\boldsymbol{L}_y = \begin{bmatrix}0&0&1\\0&0&0\\-1&0&0\end{bmatrix}, \quad
\boldsymbol{L}_z = \begin{bmatrix}0&-1&0\\1&0&0\\0&0&0\end{bmatrix}.$$

The commutation relations of these basis elements are,

$$[\boldsymbol{L}_x, \boldsymbol{L}_y] = \boldsymbol{L}_z, \quad
[\boldsymbol{L}_z, \boldsymbol{L}_x] = \boldsymbol{L}_y, \quad
[\boldsymbol{L}_y, \boldsymbol{L}_z] = \boldsymbol{L}_x$$

which agree with the relations of the three standard unit vectors of $\R^3$ under the cross product.

As announced above, one can identify any matrix in this Lie algebra with an Euler vector $\boldsymbol{\omega} = (x,y,z) \in \R^3,$

$$\widehat{\boldsymbol{\omega}} =\boldsymbol{\omega}\cdot \boldsymbol{L} = x \boldsymbol{L}_x + y \boldsymbol{L}_y + z \boldsymbol{L}_z =\begin{bmatrix}0&-z&y\\z&0&-x\\-y&x&0\end{bmatrix} \in \mathfrak{so}(3).$$

This identification is sometimes called the hat-map. Under this identification, the $\mathfrak{so}(3)$ bracket corresponds in $\R^3$ to the cross product,

$$\left [\widehat{\boldsymbol{u}},\widehat{\boldsymbol{v}} \right ] = \widehat{\boldsymbol{u} \times \boldsymbol{v}}.$$

The matrix identified with a vector $\boldsymbol{u}$ has the property that

$$\widehat{\boldsymbol{u}}\boldsymbol{v} = \boldsymbol{u} \times \boldsymbol{v},$$

where the left-hand side we have ordinary matrix multiplication. This implies $\boldsymbol{u}$ is in the null space of the skew-symmetric matrix with which it is identified, because $\boldsymbol{u} \times \boldsymbol{u} = \boldsymbol{0}.$

=== A note on Lie algebras ===
In Lie algebra representations, the group SO(3) is compact and simple of rank 1, and so it has a single independent Casimir element, a quadratic invariant function of the three generators which commutes with all of them. The Killing form for the rotation group is just the Kronecker delta, and so this Casimir invariant is simply the sum of the squares of the generators, $\boldsymbol{J}_x, \boldsymbol{J}_y, \boldsymbol{J}_z,$ of the algebra

$$[\boldsymbol{J}_x, \boldsymbol{J}_y] = \boldsymbol{J}_z, \quad
[\boldsymbol{J}_z, \boldsymbol{J}_x] = \boldsymbol{J}_y, \quad
[\boldsymbol{J}_y, \boldsymbol{J}_z] = \boldsymbol{J}_x.$$

That is, the Casimir invariant is given by

$$\boldsymbol{J}^2\equiv \boldsymbol{J}\cdot \boldsymbol{J} =\boldsymbol{J}_x^2+\boldsymbol{J}_y^2+\boldsymbol{J}_z^2 \propto \boldsymbol{I}.$$

For unitary irreducible representations D^{j}, the eigenvalues of this invariant are real and discrete, and characterize each representation, which is finite dimensional, of dimensionality $2j+1$. That is, the eigenvalues of this Casimir operator are

$$\boldsymbol{J}^2=- j(j+1) \boldsymbol{I}_{2j+1},$$

where j is integer or half-integer, and referred to as the spin or angular momentum.

So, the 3 × 3 generators L displayed above act on the triplet (spin 1) representation, while the 2 × 2 generators below, t, act on the doublet (spin-1/2) representation. By taking Kronecker products of D^{1/2} with itself repeatedly, one may construct all higher irreducible representations D^{j}. That is, the resulting generators for higher spin systems in three spatial dimensions, for arbitrarily large j, can be calculated using these spin operators and ladder operators.

For every unitary irreducible representations D^{j} there is an equivalent one, D^{−j−1}. All infinite-dimensional irreducible representations must be non-unitary, since the group is compact.

In quantum mechanics, the Casimir invariant is the "angular-momentum-squared" operator; integer values of spin j characterize bosonic representations, while half-integer values fermionic representations. The antihermitian matrices used above are utilized as spin operators, after they are multiplied by i, so they are now hermitian (like the Pauli matrices). Thus, in this language,

$$[\boldsymbol{J}_x, \boldsymbol{J}_y] = i\boldsymbol{J}_z, \quad
[\boldsymbol{J}_z, \boldsymbol{J}_x] = i\boldsymbol{J}_y, \quad
[\boldsymbol{J}_y, \boldsymbol{J}_z] = i\boldsymbol{J}_x.$$

and hence

$$\boldsymbol{J}^2= j(j+1) \boldsymbol{I}_{2j+1}.$$

Explicit expressions for these D^{j} are,

$$\begin{align}
\left (\boldsymbol{J}_z^{(j)}\right )_{ba} &= (j+1-a)\delta_{b,a}\\
\left (\boldsymbol{J}_x^{(j)}\right )_{ba} &=\frac{1}{2}  \left (\delta_{b,a+1}+\delta_{b+1,a} \right ) \sqrt{(j+1)(a+b-1)-ab}\\
\left (\boldsymbol{J}_y^{(j)}\right )_{ba} &=\frac{1}{2i} \left (\delta_{b,a+1}-\delta_{b+1,a} \right ) \sqrt{(j+1)(a+b-1)-ab}\\
\end{align}$$

where j is arbitrary and $1 \le a, b \le 2j+1$.

For example, the resulting spin matrices for spin 1 ($j = 1$) are

$$\begin{align}
\boldsymbol{J}_x &= \frac{1}{\sqrt{2}}
\begin{pmatrix}
0 &1 &0\\
1 &0 &1\\
0 &1 &0
\end{pmatrix} \\
\boldsymbol{J}_y &= \frac{1}{\sqrt{2}}
\begin{pmatrix}
0 &-i &0\\
i &0 &-i\\
0 &i &0
\end{pmatrix} \\
\boldsymbol{J}_z &=
\begin{pmatrix}
1 &0 &0\\
0 &0 &0\\
0 &0 &-1
\end{pmatrix}
\end{align}$$

Note, however, how these are in an equivalent, but different basis, the spherical basis, than the above iL in the Cartesian basis. (Note: Specifically, $\boldsymbol{U} \boldsymbol{J}_{\alpha}\boldsymbol{U}^\dagger=i\boldsymbol{L}_\alpha$ for $$\boldsymbol{U}= \left( \begin{array}{ccc} -\frac{i}{\sqrt{2}} & 0 & \frac{i}{\sqrt{2}} \\ \frac{1}{\sqrt{2}} & 0 & \frac{1}{\sqrt{2}} \\ 0 & i & 0 \\ \end{array} \right).$$)

For higher spins, such as spin $\tfrac32$ ($j=\tfrac{3}{2}$):

$$\begin{align}
\boldsymbol{J}_x &= \frac{1}{2}
\begin{pmatrix}
0 &\sqrt{3} &0 &0\\
\sqrt{3} &0 &2 &0\\
0 &2 &0 &\sqrt{3}\\
0 &0 &\sqrt{3} &0
\end{pmatrix} \\
\boldsymbol{J}_y &= \frac{1}{2}
\begin{pmatrix}
0 &-i\sqrt{3} &0 &0\\
i\sqrt{3} &0 &-2i &0\\
0 &2i &0 &-i\sqrt{3}\\
0 &0 &i\sqrt{3} &0
\end{pmatrix} \\
\boldsymbol{J}_z &=\frac{1}{2}
\begin{pmatrix}
3 &0 &0 &0\\
0 &1 &0 &0\\
0 &0 &-1 &0\\
0 &0 &0 &-3
\end{pmatrix}.
\end{align}$$

For spin $\tfrac52$ ($j = \tfrac{5}{2}$),

$$\begin{align}
\boldsymbol{J}_x &= \frac{1}{2}
\begin{pmatrix}
0 &\sqrt{5} &0 &0 &0 &0 \\
\sqrt{5} &0 &2\sqrt{2} &0 &0 &0 \\
0 &2\sqrt{2} &0 &3 &0 &0 \\
0 &0 &3 &0 &2\sqrt{2} &0 \\
0 &0 &0 &2\sqrt{2} &0 &\sqrt{5} \\
0 &0 &0 &0 &\sqrt{5} &0
\end{pmatrix} \\
\boldsymbol{J}_y &= \frac{1}{2}
\begin{pmatrix}
0 &-i\sqrt{5} &0 &0 &0 &0 \\
i\sqrt{5} &0 &-2i\sqrt{2} &0 &0 &0 \\
0 &2i\sqrt{2} &0 &-3i &0 &0 \\
0 &0 &3i &0 &-2i\sqrt{2} &0 \\
0 &0 &0 &2i\sqrt{2} &0 &-i\sqrt{5} \\
0 &0 &0 &0 &i\sqrt{5} &0
\end{pmatrix} \\
\boldsymbol{J}_z &= \frac{1}{2}
\begin{pmatrix}
5 &0 &0 &0 &0 &0 \\
0 &3 &0 &0 &0 &0 \\
0 &0 &1 &0 &0 &0 \\
0 &0 &0 &-1 &0 &0 \\
0 &0 &0 &0 &-3 &0 \\
0 &0 &0 &0 &0 &-5
\end{pmatrix}.
\end{align}$$

=== Isomorphism with 𝖘𝖚(2) ===
The Lie algebras $\mathfrak{so}(3)$ and $\mathfrak{su}(2)$ are isomorphic. One basis for $\mathfrak{su}(2)$ is given by

$$\boldsymbol{t}_1 = \frac{1}{2}\begin{bmatrix}0 & -i\\ -i & 0\end{bmatrix}, \quad \boldsymbol{t}_2 = \frac{1}{2} \begin{bmatrix}0 & -1\\ 1 & 0\end{bmatrix}, \quad \boldsymbol{t}_3 = \frac{1}{2}\begin{bmatrix}-i & 0\\ 0 & i\end{bmatrix}.$$

These are related to the Pauli matrices by

$$\boldsymbol{t}_i \longleftrightarrow \frac{1}{2i} \sigma_i.$$

The Pauli matrices abide by the physicists' convention for Lie algebras. In that convention, Lie algebra elements are multiplied by i, the exponential map (below) is defined with an extra factor of i in the exponent and the structure constants remain the same, but the definition of them acquires a factor of i. Likewise, commutation relations acquire a factor of i. The commutation relations for the $\boldsymbol{t}_i$ are

$$[\boldsymbol{t}_i, \boldsymbol{t}_j] = \varepsilon_{ijk}\boldsymbol{t}_k,$$

where ε_{ijk} is the totally anti-symmetric symbol with ε_{123} = 1. The isomorphism between $\mathfrak{so}(3)$ and $\mathfrak{su}(2)$ can be set up in several ways. For later convenience, $\mathfrak{so}(3)$ and $\mathfrak{su}(2)$ are identified by mapping

$$\boldsymbol{L}_x \longleftrightarrow \boldsymbol{t}_1, \quad \boldsymbol{L}_y \longleftrightarrow \boldsymbol{t}_2, \quad \boldsymbol{L}_z \longleftrightarrow \boldsymbol{t}_3,$$

and extending by linearity.

== Exponential map ==
Since SO(3) is a matrix Lie group, its exponential map is defined using the standard matrix exponential series,

$$\begin{cases}
\exp : \mathfrak{so}(3) \to \operatorname{SO}(3) \\
A \mapsto e^A = \sum_{k=0}^\infty \frac{1}{k!} A^k
= I + A + \tfrac{1}{2} A^2 + \cdots.
\end{cases}$$

For any skew-symmetric matrix A ∈ 𝖘𝖔(3), e^{A} is always in SO(3). The proof uses the elementary properties of the matrix exponential

$$\left(e^A\right)^\textsf{T} e^A = e^{A^\textsf{T}} e^A = e^{A^\textsf{T} + A} = e^{-A + A} = e^{A - A} = e^A \left(e^A\right)^\textsf{T} = e^0 = I.$$

since the matrices A and A^{T} commute, this can be easily proven with the skew-symmetric matrix condition. This is not enough to show that 𝖘𝖔(3) is the corresponding Lie algebra for SO(3), and shall be proven separately.

The level of difficulty of proof depends on how a matrix group Lie algebra is defined. Hall (2003) defines the Lie algebra as the set of matrices

$$\left\{A \in \operatorname{M}(n, \R) \left| e^{tA} \in \operatorname{SO}(3) \forall t\right.\right\},$$

in which case it is trivial. Rossmann (2002) uses for a definition derivatives of smooth curve segments in SO(3) through the identity taken at the identity, in which case it is harder.

For a fixed A ≠ 0, e^{tA}, −∞ < t < ∞ is a one-parameter subgroup along a geodesic in SO(3). That this gives a one-parameter subgroup follows directly from properties of the exponential map.

The exponential map provides a diffeomorphism between a neighborhood of the origin in the 𝖘𝖔(3) and a neighborhood of the identity in the SO(3). For a proof, see Closed subgroup theorem.

The exponential map is surjective. This follows from the fact that every R ∈ SO(3), since every rotation leaves an axis fixed (Euler's rotation theorem), and is conjugate to a block diagonal matrix of the form

$$D = \begin{pmatrix}\cos \theta & -\sin \theta & 0\\ \sin \theta & \cos \theta & 0\\ 0 & 0 & 1\end{pmatrix} = e^{\theta L_z},$$

such that A = BDB^{−1}, and that

$$Be^{\theta L_z}B^{-1} = e^{B\theta L_zB^{-1}},$$

together with the fact that 𝖘𝖔(3) is closed under the adjoint action of SO(3), meaning that BθL_{z}B^{−1} ∈ 𝖘𝖔(3).

Thus, e.g., it is easy to check the popular identity

$$e^{-\pi L_x/2} e^{\theta L_z} e^{\pi L_x/2} = e^{\theta L_y}.$$

As shown above, every element A ∈ 𝖘𝖔(3) is associated with a vector ω = θ u, where u = (x,y,z) is a unit magnitude vector. Since u is in the null space of A, if one now rotates to a new basis, through some other orthogonal matrix O, with u as the z axis, the final column and row of the rotation matrix in the new basis will be zero.

Thus, we know in advance from the formula for the exponential that exp(OAO^{T}) must leave u fixed. It is mathematically impossible to supply a straightforward formula for such a basis as a function of u, because its existence would violate the hairy ball theorem; but direct exponentiation is possible, and yields

$$\begin{align}
\exp(\tilde{\boldsymbol{\omega}})
&= \exp(\theta(\boldsymbol{u} \cdot \boldsymbol{L}))
= \exp\left(\theta \begin{bmatrix}
0 & -z & y \\
z & 0 & -x \\
-y & x & 0
\end{bmatrix}\right) \\[4pt]
&= I + s (\boldsymbol{u} \cdot \boldsymbol{L}) + (1 - c) (\boldsymbol{u} \cdot \boldsymbol{L})^2 \\[4pt]
&= \begin{bmatrix}
c + x^2 (1 - c) &  - z s + x y (1 - c) & y s + x z (1 - c)\\
z s + y x (1 - c)& c + y^2 (1 - c) & - x s + y z (1 - c)\\
- y s + z x (1 - c) & x s + z y (1 - c) & c + z^2 (1 - c)
\end{bmatrix},
\end{align}$$

where $c = \cos\theta$ and $s = \sin\theta$. This is recognized as a matrix for a rotation around axis u by the angle θ: cf. Rodrigues' rotation formula.

== Logarithm map ==
Given R ∈ SO(3), let $A = \tfrac{1}{2} \left(R - R^\mathrm{T}\right)$ denote the antisymmetric part and let $\|A\| = \sqrt{-\frac{1}{2}\operatorname{Tr}\left(A^2\right)}.$ Then, the logarithm of R is given by

$$\log R = \frac{\sin^{-1}\|A\|}{\|A\|}A.$$

This is manifest by inspection of the mixed symmetry form of Rodrigues' formula,

$$e^X = I + \frac{\sin \theta}{\theta}X + 2\frac{\sin^2\frac{\theta}{2}}{\theta^2}X^2, \quad \theta = \|X\|,$$

where the first and last term on the right-hand side are symmetric.

== Uniform random sampling ==
$SO(3)$ is doubly covered by the group of unit quaternions, which is isomorphic to the 3-sphere. Since the Haar measure on the unit quaternions is just the 3-area measure in 4 dimensions, the Haar measure on $SO(3)$ is just the pushforward of the 3-area measure.

Consequently, generating a uniformly random rotation in $\R^3$ is equivalent to generating a uniformly random point on the 3-sphere. This can be accomplished by the following
$$(\sqrt{1-u_1}\sin(2\pi u_2), \sqrt{1-u_1}\cos(2\pi u_2), \sqrt{u_1}\sin(2\pi u_3), \sqrt{u_1}\cos(2\pi u_3))$$

where $u_1, u_2, u_3$ are uniformly random samples of $[0, 1]$.

== Products of rotations ==
Let $R_1,R_2\in SO(3)$ be rotations through angles $\theta_1,\theta_2$ about the unit vectors $\mathbf n_1,\mathbf n_2$, respectively. Represent them by the unit quaternions

$$q_i
=
\cos\frac{\theta_i}{2}
+
\mathbf n_i\sin\frac{\theta_i}{2},
\qquad i=1,2 .$$

The composite rotation $R_2R_1$ is represented by the quaternion product $q_2q_1$. Writing

$$c_i=\cos\frac{\theta_i}{2},
\qquad
s_i=\sin\frac{\theta_i}{2},$$

and denoting the axis and angle of the composite rotation by $\mathbf n$ and $\theta$, quaternion multiplication gives

$$\cos\frac{\theta}{2}
=
c_2c_1
-
s_2s_1\,\mathbf n_2\cdot\mathbf n_1 ,$$

and

$$\mathbf n\sin\frac{\theta}{2}
=
c_2s_1\,\mathbf n_1
+
s_2c_1\,\mathbf n_2
+
s_2s_1\,\mathbf n_2\times\mathbf n_1 .$$

Together these equations give the angle and, except for the identity rotation, the axis of the product. An equivalent composition law for finite rotations was given by Olinde Rodrigues in 1840.

Interchanging the two factors leaves the scalar term unchanged but reverses the cross-product term. Thus the composition is in general noncommutative. For rotations about the same oriented axis, the cross-product term vanishes and the rotation angles add.

For a finite ordered product

$$R=R_N R_{N-1}\cdots R_1 ,$$

the corresponding unit quaternion is

$$q=q_N q_{N-1}\cdots q_1 .$$

The product therefore again represents a single three-dimensional rotation, although in general it depends on the order of the factors.

For a finite ordered product of rotations, consider uniformly scaling the individual rotation angles while keeping their axes fixed. Denote the resulting product by $W(\lambda)=R_N(\lambda)\cdots R_1(\lambda)$. For generic sequences, there exists a positive scaling factor $\lambda$ for which $W(\lambda)$ is a half-turn, so that $W(\lambda)^2=I$. Thus, repeating the scaled sequence twice restores the initial orientation, whereas a single traversal generally does not.

=== Baker–Campbell–Hausdorff formula ===
Rotation composition can also be described in the Lie algebra. For $X,Y\in\mathfrak{so}(3)$ sufficiently close to zero, write

$$e^X e^Y=e^Z .$$

The Baker–Campbell–Hausdorff formula gives

$$Z
=
X+Y
+\frac12[X,Y]
+\frac1{12}[X,[X,Y]]
+\frac1{12}[Y,[Y,X]]
+\cdots .$$

Under the standard identification of $\mathfrak{so}(3)$ with $\mathbb R^3$,

$$[\widehat{\mathbf x},\widehat{\mathbf y}]
=
\widehat{\mathbf x\times\mathbf y}.$$

Thus the commutator terms correspond to cross-product corrections to vector addition. The quaternion formulas above give the composition of finite rotations directly, whereas the BCH formula expresses the logarithm of the product as a Lie-algebra series.

== Infinitesimal rotations ==
An infinitesimal rotation matrix or differential rotation matrix is a matrix representing an infinitely small rotation.

While a rotation matrix is an orthogonal matrix $R^\mathsf{T} = R^{-1}$ representing an element of $\mathrm{SO}(n)$ (the special orthogonal group), the differential of a rotation is a skew-symmetric matrix $A^\mathsf{T} = -A$ in the tangent space $\mathfrak{so}(n)$ (the special orthogonal Lie algebra), which is not itself a rotation matrix.

An infinitesimal rotation matrix has the form

$$I + d\theta \, A,$$

where $I$ is the identity matrix, $d\theta$ is vanishingly small, and $A \in \mathfrak{so}(n)$.

For example, if $A = L_x$, representing an infinitesimal three-dimensional rotation about the x-axis, a basis element of $\mathfrak{so}(3)$, then

$$L_{x} = \begin{bmatrix} 0 & 0 & 0 \\ 0 & 0 & -1 \\ 0 & 1 & 0 \end{bmatrix} ,$$

and

$$I+d\theta L_{x} = \begin{bmatrix} 1 & 0 & 0 \\ 0 & 1 & -d\theta \\ 0 & d\theta & 1 \end{bmatrix} .$$

The computation rules for infinitesimal rotation matrices are the usual ones except that infinitesimals of second order are dropped. With these rules, these matrices do not satisfy all the same properties as ordinary finite rotation matrices under the usual treatment of infinitesimals. It turns out that the order in which infinitesimal rotations are applied is irrelevant.

== Realizations of rotations ==
We have seen that there are a variety of ways to represent rotations:

- as orthogonal matrices with determinant 1,
- by axis and rotation angle
- in quaternion algebra with versors and the map 3-sphere S^{3} → SO(3) (see quaternions and spatial rotations)
- in geometric algebra as a rotor
- as a sequence of three rotations about three fixed axes; see Euler angles.

== Spherical harmonics ==
The group SO(3) of three-dimensional Euclidean rotations has an infinite-dimensional representation on the Hilbert space

$$L^2\left(\mathbf{S}^2\right) = \operatorname{span} \left\{ Y^\ell_m, \ell \in \N^+, -\ell \leq m \leq \ell \right\},$$

where $Y^\ell_m$ are spherical harmonics. Its elements are square integrable complex-valued functions (Note: The elements of L^{2}(S^{2}) are actually equivalence classes of functions. two functions are declared equivalent if they differ merely on a set of measure zero. The integral is the Lebesgue integral in order to obtain a complete inner product space.) on the sphere. The inner product on this space is given by

$\langle f,g\rangle = \int_{\mathbf{S}^2}\overline{f}g\,d\Omega = \int_0^{2\pi} \int_0^\pi \overline{f}g \sin\theta \, d\theta \, d\phi.$	H1

If f is an arbitrary square integrable function defined on the unit sphere S^{2}, then it can be expressed as

$|f\rangle = \sum_{\ell = 1}^\infty\sum_{m = -\ell}^{m = \ell} \left|Y_m^\ell\right\rangle\left\langle Y_m^\ell|f\right\rangle, \qquad f(\theta, \phi) = \sum_{\ell = 1}^\infty\sum_{m = -\ell}^{m = \ell} f_{\ell m} Y^\ell_m(\theta, \phi),$	H2

where the expansion coefficients are given by

$f_{\ell m} = \left\langle Y_m^\ell, f \right\rangle = \int_{\mathbf{S}^2}\overline{{Y^\ell_m}}f \, d\Omega = \int_0^{2\pi} \int_0^\pi \overline{{Y_m^\ell}}(\theta, \phi)f(\theta, \phi)\sin \theta \, d\theta \, d\phi.$	H3

The Lorentz group action restricts to that of SO(3) and is expressed as

$(\Pi(R)f)(\theta(x), \phi(x)) = \sum_{\ell = 1}^\infty\sum_{m = -\ell}^{m = \ell}\sum_{m' = -\ell}^{m' = \ell} D^{(\ell)}_{mm'} (R) f_{\ell m'}Y^\ell_m \left(\theta\left(R^{-1}x\right), \phi\left(R^{-1}x\right)\right), \qquad R \in \operatorname{SO}(3), \quad x \in \mathbf{S}^2.$	H4

This action is unitary, meaning that

$\langle \Pi(R)f,\Pi(R)g\rangle = \langle f,g \rangle \qquad \forall f,g \in \mathbf{S}^2, \quad \forall R \in \operatorname{SO}(3).$	H5

The D^{(ℓ)} can be obtained from the D^{(m, n)} of above using Clebsch–Gordan decomposition, but they are more easily directly expressed as an exponential of an odd-dimensional su(2)-representation (the 3-dimensional one is exactly 𝖘𝖔(3)). In this case the space L^{2}(S^{2}) decomposes neatly into an infinite direct sum of irreducible odd finite-dimensional representations V_{2i + 1}, i = 0, 1, ... according to

$L^2\left(\mathbf{S}^2\right) = \sum_{i = 0}^\infty V_{2i + 1} \equiv \bigoplus_{i=0}^\infty \operatorname{span}\left\{Y_m^i, -i \leq m \leq i \right\}.$	H6

This is characteristic of infinite-dimensional unitary representations of SO(3). If Π is an infinite-dimensional unitary representation on a separable (Note: A Hilbert space is separable if and only if it has a countable basis. All separable Hilbert spaces are isomorphic.) Hilbert space, then it decomposes as a direct sum of finite-dimensional unitary representations. Such a representation is thus never irreducible. All irreducible finite-dimensional representations (Π, V) can be made unitary by an appropriate choice of inner product,

$$\langle f, g\rangle_U \equiv \int_{\operatorname{SO}(3)} \langle\Pi(R)f, \Pi(R)g\rangle \, dg = \frac{1}{8\pi^2} \int_0^{2\pi} \int_0^\pi \int_0^{2\pi} \langle \Pi(R)f, \Pi(R)g\rangle \sin \theta \, d\phi \, d\theta \, d\psi, \quad f,g \in V,$$

where the integral is the unique invariant integral over SO(3) normalized to 1, here expressed using the Euler angles parametrization. The inner product inside the integral is any inner product on V.

== Generalizations ==
The rotation group generalizes quite naturally to n-dimensional Euclidean space, $\R^n$ with its standard Euclidean structure. The group of all proper and improper rotations in n dimensions is called the orthogonal group O(n), and the subgroup of proper rotations is called the special orthogonal group SO(n), which is a Lie group of dimension $\tfrac12 n(n-1)$.

In special relativity, one works in a 4-dimensional vector space, known as Minkowski space rather than 3-dimensional Euclidean space. Unlike Euclidean space, Minkowski space has an inner product with an indefinite signature. However, one can still define generalized rotations which preserve this inner product. Such generalized rotations are known as Lorentz transformations and the group of all such transformations is called the Lorentz group.

The rotation group SO(3) can be described as a subgroup of E^{+}(3), the Euclidean group of direct isometries of Euclidean $\R^3.$ This larger group is the group of all motions of a rigid body: each of these is a combination of a rotation about an arbitrary axis and a translation, or put differently, a combination of an element of SO(3) and an arbitrary translation.

In general, the rotation group of an object is the symmetry group within the group of direct isometries; in other words, the intersection of the full symmetry group and the group of direct isometries. For chiral objects it is the same as the full symmetry group.

== See also ==
- Angular momentum
- Charts on SO(3)
- Coordinate rotations
- Euler angles
- Infinitesimal rotation
- Lie group
- Orthogonal group
- Pauli matrix
- Pin group
- Plane of rotation
- Plate trick
- Quaternions and spatial rotations
- Representations of SO(3)
- Rigid body
- Rodrigues' rotation formula
- Spherical harmonics
- Spherical symmetry
- Three-dimensional rotation operator
- Rotation formulations in three dimensions

== Bibliography ==
- Boas, Mary L. (2006), Mathematical Methods in the Physical Sciences (3rd ed.), John Wiley & sons, pp. 120, 127, 129, 155ff and 535, ISBN 978-0471198260
- Curtright, T. L.; Fairlie, D. B.; Zachos, C. K. (2014), "A compact formula for rotations as spin matrix polynomials", SIGMA, 10: 084, arXiv:1402.3541, Bibcode:2014SIGMA..10..084C, doi:10.3842/SIGMA.2014.084, S2CID 18776942
- Engø, Kenth (2001), "On the BCH-formula in 𝖘𝖔(3)", BIT Numerical Mathematics, 41 (3): 629–632, doi:10.1023/A:1021979515229, ISSN 0006-3835, S2CID 126053191
- Gelfand, I.M.; Minlos, R.A.; Shapiro, Z.Ya. (1963), Representations of the Rotation and Lorentz Groups and their Applications, New York: Pergamon Press
- Goldstein, Herbert; Poole, Charles P.; Safko, John L. (2002), Classical Mechanics (third ed.), Addison Wesley, ISBN 978-0-201-65702-9
- Hall, Brian C. (2015), Lie Groups, Lie Algebras, and Representations: An Elementary Introduction, Graduate Texts in Mathematics, vol. 222 (2nd ed.), Springer, ISBN 978-3319134666
- Hall, Brian C. (2003). Lie groups, Lie algebras, and representations : an elementary introduction. Graduate Texts in Mathematics. Vol. 222. New York: Springer. ISBN 0-387-40122-9.
- Jacobson, Nathan (2009), Basic algebra, vol. 1 (2nd ed.), Dover Publications, ISBN 978-0-486-47189-1
- Joshi, A. W. (2007), Elements of Group Theory for Physicists, New Age International, pp. 111ff, ISBN 978-81-224-0975-8
- Rossmann, Wulf (2002), Lie Groups – An Introduction Through Linear Groups, Oxford Graduate Texts in Mathematics, Oxford Science Publications, ISBN 0-19-859683-9
- van der Waerden, B. L. (1974), Group Theory and Quantum Mechanics, Berlin: Springer-Verlag, ISBN 978-3-642-65862-4 (translation of the original 1932 edition, Die Gruppentheoretische Methode in Der Quantenmechanik).
- Varadarajan, V. S. (1984). Lie groups, Lie algebras, and their representations. New York: Springer-Verlag. ISBN 978-0-387-90969-1.
- Veltman, M.; 't Hooft, G.; de Wit, B. (2007). "Lie Groups in Physics (online lecture)" (PDF)..
