= Rodrigues' rotation formula =

Vector formula for a rotation in space, given its axis

In the theory of three-dimensional rotation, Rodrigues' rotation formula, named after Olinde Rodrigues, is an efficient algorithm for rotating a vector in space, given an axis and angle of rotation. By extension, this can be used to transform all three basis vectors to compute a rotation matrix in SO(3), the group of all rotation matrices, from an axis–angle representation. In terms of Lie theory, this Rodrigues' formula provides an algorithm to compute the exponential map from the Lie algebra so(3) to its Lie group SO(3).

This formula is variously credited to Leonhard Euler, Olinde Rodrigues, or a combination of the two. A detailed historical analysis in 1989 concluded that the formula should be attributed to Euler, and recommended calling it "Euler's finite rotation formula." This proposal has received notable support, but some others have viewed the formula as just one of many variations of the Euler–Rodrigues formula, thereby crediting both.

== Statement ==
If v is a vector in ℝ^{3} and k is a unit vector describing an axis of rotation about which v rotates by an angle θ according to the right hand rule, the Rodrigues formula for the rotated vector v_{rot} is

$\mathbf{v}_\mathrm{rot} = \mathbf{v} \cos\theta + (\mathbf{k} \times \mathbf{v})\sin\theta + \mathbf{k} ~(\mathbf{k} \cdot \mathbf{v}) (1 - \cos\theta)\,.$

The intuition of the above formula is that the first term scales the vector down, while the second skews it (via vector addition) toward the new rotational position. The third term re-adds the height (relative to $\textbf{k}$) that was lost by the first term.

An alternative statement is to write the axis vector as a cross product a × b of any two nonzero vectors a and b which define the plane of rotation, and the sense of the angle θ is measured away from a and towards b. Letting α denote the angle between these vectors, the two angles θ and α are not necessarily equal, but they are measured in the same sense. Then the unit axis vector can be written

$$\mathbf{k} = \frac{\mathbf{a}\times\mathbf{b}}{|\mathbf{a}\times\mathbf{b}|} = \frac{\mathbf{a}\times\mathbf{b}}{|\mathbf{a}||\mathbf{b}|\sin\alpha}\,.$$

This form may be more useful when two vectors defining a plane are involved. An example in physics is the Thomas precession which includes the rotation given by Rodrigues' formula, in terms of two non-collinear boost velocities, and the axis of rotation is perpendicular to their plane.

== Derivation ==
Rodrigues' rotation formula rotates v by an angle θ around vector k by decomposing it into its components parallel and perpendicular to k, and rotating only the perpendicular component.

Vector geometry of Rodrigues' rotation formula, as well as the decomposition into parallel and perpendicular components.

Let k be a unit vector defining a rotation axis, and let v be any vector to rotate about k by angle θ (right hand rule, anticlockwise in the figure), producing the rotated vector $\mathbb{v}_{\text{rot}}$.

Using the dot and cross products, the vector v can be decomposed into components parallel and perpendicular to the axis k,

$$\mathbf{v} = \mathbf{v}_\parallel + \mathbf{v}_\perp \,,$$

where the component parallel to k is called the vector projection of v on k,

$$\mathbf{v}_\parallel = (\mathbf{v} \cdot \mathbf{k}) \mathbf{k}$$,

and the component perpendicular to k is called the vector rejection of v from k:

$$\mathbf{v}_{\perp} = \mathbf{v} - \mathbf{v}_{\parallel} = \mathbf{v} - (\mathbf{k} \cdot \mathbf{v}) \mathbf{k} = - \mathbf{k}\times(\mathbf{k}\times\mathbf{v})$$,

where the last equality follows from the vector triple product formula: $\mathbf{a}\times (\mathbf{b} \times \mathbf{c}) = (\mathbf{a} \cdot \mathbf{c})\mathbf{b} - (\mathbf{a} \cdot \mathbf{b})\mathbf{c}$. Finally, the vector $\mathbf{k} \times \mathbf{v}_{\perp} = \mathbf{k} \times \mathbf{v}$ is a copy of $\mathbf{v}_{\perp}$ rotated 90° around $\mathbf{k}$. Thus the three vectors
$$\mathbf{k}\,,\
\mathbf{v}_{\perp}\,,\,
\mathbf{k} \times \mathbf{v}$$
form a right-handed orthogonal basis of $\mathbb{R}^3$, with the last two vectors of equal length.

Animated geometric illustration of Rodrigues rotation formula: a vector is decomposed into components parallel and perpendicular to the rotation axis, and the perpendicular component is rotated in its plane.

Under the rotation, the component $\mathbf{v}_{\parallel}$ parallel to the axis will not change magnitude nor direction:

$$\mathbf{v}_{\parallel\mathrm{rot}} = \mathbf{v}_\parallel \,;$$

while the perpendicular component will retain its magnitude but rotate its direction in the perpendicular plane spanned by $\mathbf{v}_{\perp}$ and $\mathbf{k} \times \mathbf{v}$, according to

$$\mathbf{v}_{\perp\mathrm{rot}}
= \cos(\theta) \mathbf{v}_\perp + \sin(\theta) \mathbf{k}\times\mathbf{v}_\perp
= \cos(\theta) \mathbf{v}_\perp + \sin(\theta) \mathbf{k}\times\mathbf{v} \,,$$

in analogy with the planar polar coordinates (r, θ) in the Cartesian basis e_{x}, e_{y}:

$$\mathbf{r} = r\cos(\theta) \mathbf{e}_x + r\sin(\theta) \mathbf{e}_y \,.$$

Now the full rotated vector is:

$$\mathbf{v}_{\mathrm{rot}}
= \mathbf{v}_{\parallel\mathrm{rot}} + \mathbf{v}_{\perp\mathrm{rot}}
= \mathbf{v}_\parallel + \cos(\theta) \, \mathbf{v}_\perp + \sin(\theta) \mathbf{k}\times\mathbf{v} .$$

Substituting $\mathbf{v}_{\perp} = \mathbf{v} - \mathbf{v}_{\|}$ or $\mathbf{v}_{\| } = \mathbf{v} - \mathbf{v}_{\perp}$ in the last expression gives respectively:

$$\mathbf{v}_{\text{rot}}
= \cos(\theta) \, \mathbf{v}
+ \sin(\theta) \mathbf{k}\times\mathbf{v}
+ (1 - \cos\theta)(\mathbf{k} \cdot \mathbf{v})\mathbf{k}$$
$$\phantom{\mathbf{v}_{\text{rot}}}
= \mathbf{v}
+ \sin(\theta) \mathbf{k}\times\mathbf{v}
+ (1-\cos\theta)\mathbf{k}\times(\mathbf{k}\times\mathbf{v}).$$

== Matrix notation ==
The linear transformation on $\mathbf{v}\isin\mathbb{R}^3$ defined by the cross product $\mathbf{v} \mapsto \mathbf{k} \times \mathbf{v}$ is given in coordinates by representing v and k × v as column matrices:

$$\begin{bmatrix} (\mathbf{k}\times\mathbf{v})_x \\ (\mathbf{k}\times\mathbf{v})_y
\\ (\mathbf{k}\times\mathbf{v})_z \end{bmatrix}
= \begin{bmatrix} k_y v_z - k_z v_y \\ k_z v_x - k_x v_z \\ k_x v_y - k_y v_x \end{bmatrix}
= \left[\begin{array}{rrr}
0\ \,  & -k_z & k_y \\
k_z & 0\ \, & -k_x \\
-k_y & k_x & 0\ \,
\end{array}\right]
\begin{bmatrix} v_x \\ v_y \\ v_z \end{bmatrix} \,.$$

That is, the matrix of this linear transformation (with respect to standard coordinates) is the cross-product matrix:

$$\mathbf{K}=
\left[\begin{array}{rrr}
0\ \,  & -k_z & k_y \\
k_z & 0\ \, & -k_x \\
-k_y & k_x & 0\ \,
\end{array}\right]\,.$$

That is to say,

$$\mathbf{k}\times\mathbf{v}=\mathbf{K}\mathbf{v},
\qquad\qquad
\mathbf{k}\times(\mathbf{k}\times\mathbf{v})=\mathbf{K}(\mathbf{K}\mathbf{v}) = \mathbf{K}^2\mathbf{v} \,.$$

The last formula in the previous section can therefore be written as:

$$\mathbf{v}_{\mathrm{rot}} = \mathbf{v} + (\sin\theta) \mathbf{K}\mathbf{v} + (1 - \cos\theta)\mathbf{K}^2\mathbf{v}\,.$$

Collecting terms allows the compact expression

$$\mathbf{v}_\mathrm{rot} = \mathbf{R}\mathbf{v}$$

where

$\mathbf{R} = \mathbf{I} + (\sin\theta) \mathbf{K} + (1-\cos\theta)\mathbf{K}^2$

is the rotation matrix through an angle θ counterclockwise about the axis k, and I the 3 × 3 identity matrix. This matrix R is an element of the rotation group SO(3) of $\mathbb{R}^3$, and K is an element of the Lie algebra $\mathfrak{so}(3)$ generating that Lie group (note that K is skew-symmetric, which characterizes $\mathfrak{so}(3)$).

In terms of the matrix exponential,

$$\mathbf{R} = \exp (\theta\mathbf{K})\,.$$

To see that the last identity holds, one notes that

$$\mathbf{R}(\theta) \mathbf{R}(\phi) = \mathbf{R} (\theta+\phi), \quad \mathbf{R}(0) = \mathbf{I}\,,$$

characteristic of a one-parameter subgroup, i.e. exponential, and that the formulas match for infinitesimal θ.

For an alternative derivation based on this exponential relationship, see exponential map from $\mathfrak{so}(3)$ to SO(3). For the inverse mapping, see log map from SO(3) to $\mathfrak{so}(3)$.

The above result can be written in index notation as follows. The elements of the matrix for an active rotation by an angle $\theta$ about an axis k are given by

$$R_{ij} = \cos\theta\, \delta_{ij} + (1 - \cos\theta) k_i k_j - \sin\theta\, \epsilon_{ijl} k_l.$$

Here, i, j, and l label the Cartesian components (x, y, z) or (1, 2, 3), $\delta_{ij}$ and $\epsilon_{ijl}$ are the Kronecker and Levi-Civita symbols, and there is an implicit sum on repeated indices. More explicitly, its entries are given by:

$\mathbf{R}= \left[\begin{array}{lll} c + (1 - c) k_x^2 & (1 - c) k_x k_y - s k_z & (1 - c) k_x k_z + s k_y \\ (1 - c) k_x k_y + s k_z & c + (1 - c) k_y^2 & (1 - c) k_y k_z - s k_x \\ (1 - c) k_x k_z -s k_y & (1 - c) k_y k_z + s k_x & c + (1 - c) k_z^2 \end{array}\right]\, ,$

where $s = \sin\theta$ and $c = \cos\theta$.

The Hodge dual of the rotation $\mathbf{R}$ is just $\mathbf{R}^* = -\sin(\theta)\mathbf{k}$ which enables the extraction of both the axis of rotation and the sine of the angle of the rotation from the rotation matrix itself, with the usual ambiguity,

$$\begin{align}
\sin(\theta) &=  \sigma \left|\mathbf{R}^*\right| \\[3pt]
\mathbf{k} &= -\frac{\sigma\mathbf{R}^*}{\left|\mathbf{R}^*\right|}
\end{align}$$

where $\sigma = \pm 1$. The above simple expression results from the fact that the Hodge duals of $\mathbf{I}$ and $\mathbf{K}^2$ are zero, and $\mathbf{K}^* = -\mathbf{k}$.

== See also ==
- Axis angle
- Rotation (mathematics)
- SO(3) and SO(4)
- Euler–Rodrigues formula
