= Axis–angle representation =

Parameterization of a rotation into a unit vector and angle

The angle θ and axis unit vector e define a rotation, concisely represented by the rotation vector θe.

In mathematics, the axis–angle representation parameterizes a rotation in a three-dimensional Euclidean space by two quantities: a unit vector e indicating the direction of an axis of rotation, and an angle of rotation θ describing the magnitude and sense (e.g., clockwise) of the rotation about the axis. Only two numbers, not three, are needed to define the direction of a unit vector e rooted at the origin because the magnitude of e is constrained. For example, the elevation and azimuth angles of e suffice to locate it in any particular Cartesian coordinate frame.

By Rodrigues' rotation formula, the angle and axis determine a transformation that rotates three-dimensional vectors. The rotation occurs in the sense prescribed by the right-hand rule.

The rotation axis is sometimes called the Euler axis. The axis–angle representation is predicated on Euler's rotation theorem, which dictates that any rotation or sequence of rotations of a rigid body in a three-dimensional space is equivalent to a pure rotation about a single fixed axis.

It is one of many rotation formalisms in three dimensions.

== Rotation vector ==
The axis–angle representation is equivalent to the more concise rotation vector, also called the Euler vector (not to be confused with a tuple of Euler angles). In this case, both the rotation axis and the angle are represented by a vector codirectional with the rotation axis whose length is the rotation angle θ,
$$\boldsymbol{\theta} = \theta \mathbf{e} \,.$$
It is used for the exponential and logarithm maps involving this representation.

Many rotation vectors correspond to the same rotation. In particular, a rotation vector of length θ + 2πM, for any integer M, encodes exactly the same rotation as a rotation vector of length θ. Thus, there are at least a countable infinity of rotation vectors corresponding to any rotation. Furthermore, all rotations by 2πM are the same as no rotation at all, so, for a given integer M, all rotation vectors of length 2πM, in all directions, constitute a two-parameter uncountable infinity of rotation vectors encoding the same rotation as the zero vector. These facts must be taken into account when inverting the exponential map, that is, when finding a rotation vector that corresponds to a given rotation matrix. The exponential map is onto but not one-to-one.

=== Example ===
Say you are standing on the ground and you pick the direction of gravity to be the negative z direction. Then if you turn to your left, you will rotate (-π)/2 radians (or -90°) about the -z axis. Viewing the axis-angle representation as an ordered pair, this would be
$$( \mathrm{axis}, \mathrm{angle} ) = \left( \begin{bmatrix} e_x \\ e_y \\ e_z \end{bmatrix},\theta \right) = \left( \begin{bmatrix} 0 \\ 0 \\ -1 \end{bmatrix},\frac{-\pi}{2}\right).$$

The above example can be represented as a rotation vector with a magnitude of π/2 pointing in the z direction,
$$\begin{bmatrix} 0 \\ 0 \\ \frac{\pi}{2} \end{bmatrix}.$$

Animated example of axis-angle representation with axis direction (1, 1.5, 0.5) and varying rotation angle

== Uses ==
The axis–angle representation is convenient when dealing with rigid-body dynamics. It is useful to both characterize rotations, and also for converting between different representations of rigid body motion, such as homogeneous transformations and twists.

When a rigid body rotates around a fixed axis, its axis–angle data are a constant rotation axis and the rotation angle continuously dependent on time.

Plugging the three eigenvalues 1 and e^{±iθ} and their associated three orthogonal axes in a Cartesian representation into Mercer's theorem is a convenient construction of the Cartesian representation of the Rotation Matrix in three dimensions.

== Application ==
Rodrigues' rotation formula, named after Olinde Rodrigues, is an efficient algorithm for rotating a Euclidean vector, given a rotation axis and an angle of rotation. In other words, Rodrigues' formula provides an algorithm to compute the exponential map from $\mathfrak{so}(3)$ to SO(3) without computing the full matrix exponential.

If v is a vector in R^{3} and e is a unit vector rooted at the origin describing an axis of rotation about which v is rotated by an angle θ, Rodrigues' rotation formula to obtain the rotated vector is
$$\mathbf{v}_\mathrm{rot} =  \mathbf{v} + (\sin\theta) (\mathbf{e} \times \mathbf{v})
+ (1 - \cos\theta) (\mathbf{e} \times (\mathbf{e} \times \mathbf{v})) \,.$$

For the rotation of a single vector it may be more efficient than converting e and θ into a rotation matrix to rotate the vector.

== Relationship to other representations ==
There are several ways to represent a rotation. It is useful to understand how different representations relate to one another, and how to convert between them. Here the unit vector is denoted ω instead of e.

=== Exponential map from 𝔰𝔬(3) to SO(3) ===
The exponential map effects a transformation from the axis-angle representation of rotations to rotation matrices,
$$\exp\colon \mathfrak{so}(3) \to \mathrm{SO}(3) \,.$$

Essentially, by using a Taylor expansion one derives a closed-form relation between these two representations. Given a unit vector $\boldsymbol\omega \in \mathfrak{so}(3) = \R^3$ representing the unit rotation axis, and an angle, θ ∈ R, an equivalent rotation matrix R is given as follows, where K is the cross product matrix of ω, that is, Kv = ω × v for all vectors v ∈ R^{3},
$$R = \exp(\theta \mathbf{K}) = \sum_{k=0}^\infty\frac{(\theta \mathbf{K})^k}{k!} = I + \theta \mathbf{K} + \frac{1}{2!}(\theta \mathbf{K})^2 + \frac{1}{3!}(\theta \mathbf{K})^3 + \cdots$$

Because K is skew-symmetric, and the sum of the squares of its above-diagonal entries is 1, the characteristic polynomial P(t) of K is P(t) = det(K − tI) = −(t^{3} + t). Since, by the Cayley–Hamilton theorem, P(K) = 0, this implies that
$$\mathbf{K}^3 = -\mathbf{K} \,.$$
As a result, K^{4} = –K^{2}, K^{5} = K, K^{6} = K^{2}, K^{7} = –K.

This cyclic pattern continues indefinitely, and so all higher powers of K can be expressed in terms of K and K^{2}. Thus, from the above equation, it follows that
$$R = I + \left(\theta - \frac{\theta^3}{3!} + \frac{\theta^5}{5!} - \cdots\right) \mathbf{K} + \left(\frac{\theta^2}{2!} - \frac{\theta^4}{4!} + \frac{\theta^6}{6!} - \cdots\right) \mathbf{K}^2 \,,$$
that is,
$$R = I + (\sin\theta) \mathbf{K} + (1-\cos\theta) \mathbf{K}^2\, ,$$

by the Taylor series formula for trigonometric functions.

This is a Lie-algebraic derivation, in contrast to the geometric one in the article Rodrigues' rotation formula.

Due to the existence of the above-mentioned exponential map, the unit vector ω representing the rotation axis, and the angle θ are sometimes called the exponential coordinates of the rotation matrix R.

=== Log map from SO(3) to 𝔰𝔬(3) ===
Let K continue to denote the 3 × 3 matrix that effects the cross product with the rotation axis ω: K(v) = ω × v for all vectors v in what follows.

To retrieve the axis–angle representation of a rotation matrix, calculate the angle of rotation from the trace of the rotation matrix:
$$\theta = \arccos\left( \frac{\operatorname{Tr}(R) - 1}{2} \right)$$
and then use that to find the normalized axis,
$$\boldsymbol{\omega} = \frac{1}{2 \sin \theta} \begin{bmatrix} R_{32}-R_{23} \\ R_{13}-R_{31} \\ R_{21}-R_{12} \end{bmatrix} ~,$$

where $R_{ij}$ is the component of the rotation matrix, $R$, in the $i$-th row and $j$-th column.

This formula does not work for $\omega$ if R is symmetric. Because, this is possible only when $\theta = k \pi$ for some integer $k$, so sin($\theta$) = 0, causing a division by 0 in the formula. However, the limit of the formula for $\omega$, as $\theta \to k \pi$, gives the correct value for $\omega$. For the general case the $\omega$ may also be found using null space of R-I, see rotation matrix#Determining the axis.

The axis-angle representation is not unique since a rotation of $-\theta$ about $-\boldsymbol{\omega}$ is the same as a rotation of $\theta$ about $\boldsymbol{\omega}$. Of course, adding any integer multiple of 2π to $\theta$ will also result in the identical rotation; a better method is to constrain $\theta$ to the interval [0, 2π) or (-π, π].

If $\theta$ is sought for a known $(R,\omega)$ pair, then it must be consistent with the orientation of the $\omega$ axis (in other words, it must lie in the appropriate quadrant of the unit circle defined by $\sin \theta$ and $\cos \theta$). Considering that the cross-product matrix $\mathbf{K}$ is also available for a given $\omega$, this consistency can be ensured by generalizing the above trace formula as follows:
$$\theta = {\rm atan2}(-{\rm Tr}(\mathbf{K} R), {\rm Tr}(R) - 1),$$
where atan2 is the two-argument arctangent function, which provides the correct sign for $\theta$ in the $(-\pi,\pi]$ interval. This method resolves the sign ambiguity that exists in the off-axis terms of $R$.

The matrix logarithm of the rotation matrix R is
$$\log R = \begin{cases}
0 & \text{if } \theta = 0 \\
\dfrac{\theta}{2 \sin \theta } \left(R - R^\mathsf{T}\right) & \text{if } \theta \ne 0 \text{ and } \theta \in (-\pi, \pi)
\end{cases}$$

An exception occurs when R has eigenvalues equal to −1. In this case, the log is not unique. However, even in the case where θ = π the Frobenius norm of the log is
$$\| \log(R) \|_\mathrm{F} = \sqrt{2} |\theta |\,.$$
Given rotation matrices A and B,
$$d_g(A,B) := \left\| \log\left(A^\mathsf{T} B\right)\right\|_\mathrm{F}$$
is the geodesic distance on the 3D manifold of rotation matrices.

For small rotations, the above computation of θ may be numerically imprecise as the derivative of arccos goes to infinity as θ → 0. In that case, the off-axis terms will actually provide better information about θ since, for small angles, R ≈ I + θK. (This is because these are the first two terms of the Taylor series for exp(θK).)

This formulation also has numerical problems at θ = π, where the off-axis terms do not give information about the rotation axis (which is still defined up to a sign ambiguity). In that case, we must reconsider the above formula.

$$R = I + \mathbf{K} \sin\theta + \mathbf{K}^2 (1-\cos\theta)$$
At θ = π, we have
$$R = I + 2 \mathbf{K}^2 = I + 2(\boldsymbol{\omega} \otimes \boldsymbol{\omega} - I) = 2 \boldsymbol{\omega} \otimes \boldsymbol{\omega} - I$$
and so let
$$B := \boldsymbol{\omega} \otimes \boldsymbol{\omega} = \frac{1}{2}(R+I) \,,$$
so the diagonal terms of B are the squares of the elements of ω and the signs (up to sign ambiguity) can be determined from the signs of the off-axis terms of B.

=== Unit quaternions ===
The following expression transforms axis–angle coordinates to versors (unit quaternions):
$$\mathbf q = \left(\cos\tfrac{\theta}{2}, \boldsymbol{\omega} \sin\tfrac{\theta}{2}\right)$$

Given a versor q = r + v represented with its scalar r and vector v, the axis–angle coordinates can be extracted using the following:
$$\begin{align}
\theta &= 2\arccos r \\[8px]
\boldsymbol{\omega} &=
\begin{cases}
\dfrac{\mathbf{v}}{ \sin \tfrac{\theta}{2} }, & \text{if } \theta \neq 0 \\
0, & \text{otherwise}.
\end{cases}
\end{align}$$

A more numerically stable expression of the rotation angle uses the atan2 function:
$$\theta = 2 \operatorname{atan2}(|\mathbf{v}|,r)\,,$$
where |v| is the Euclidean norm of the 3-vector v.

== See also ==
- Homogeneous coordinates
- Pseudovector
- Rotations without a matrix
- Screw theory, a representation of rigid-body motions and velocities using the concepts of twists, screws, and wrenches
