= Conjugation of isometries in Euclidean space =

In a group, the conjugate by g of h is ghg^{−1}.

== Translation ==
If h is a translation, then its conjugation by an isometry can be described as applying the isometry to the translation:

- the conjugation of a translation by a translation is the first translation
- the conjugation of a translation by a rotation is a translation by a rotated translation vector
- the conjugation of a translation by a reflection is a translation by a reflected translation vector

Thus the conjugacy class within the Euclidean group E(n) of a translation is the set of all translations by the same distance.

The smallest subgroup of the Euclidean group containing all translations by a given distance is the set of all translations. So, this is the conjugate closure of a singleton containing a translation.

Thus E(n) is a direct product of the orthogonal group O(n) and the subgroup of translations T, and O(n) is isomorphic with the quotient group of E(n) by T:

O(n) $\cong$ E(n) / T

Thus there is a partition of the Euclidean group with in each subset one isometries that keeps the origins fixed, and its combination with all translations.

Each isometry is given by an orthogonal matrix A in O(n) and a vector b:

$$x \mapsto Ax+ b$$

and each subset in the quotient group is given by the matrix A only.

Similarly, for the special orthogonal group SO(n) we have

SO(n) $\cong$ E^{+}(n) / T

== Inversion ==
The conjugate of the inversion in a point by a translation is the inversion in the translated point, etc.

Thus the conjugacy class within the Euclidean group E(n) of inversion in a point is the set of inversions in all points.

Since a combination of two inversions is a translation, the conjugate closure of a singleton containing inversion in a point is the set of all translations and the inversions in all points. This is the generalized dihedral group dih (R^{n}).

Similarly { I, −I } is a normal subgroup of O(n), and we have:

E(n) / dih (R^{n}) $\cong$ O(n) / { I, −I }

For odd n we also have:

O(n) $\cong$ SO(n) × { I, −I }

and hence not only

O(n) / SO(n) $\cong$ { I, −I }

but also:

O(n) / { I, −I } $\cong$ SO(n)

For even n we have:

E^{+}(n) / dih (R^{n}) $\cong$ SO(n) / { I, −I }

== Rotation ==
In 3D, the conjugate by a translation of a rotation about an axis is the corresponding rotation about the translated axis. Such a conjugation produces the screw displacement known to express an arbitrary Euclidean motion according to Chasles' theorem.

The conjugacy class within the Euclidean group E(3) of a rotation about an axis is a rotation by the same angle about any axis.

The conjugate closure of a singleton containing a rotation in 3D is E^{+}(3).

In 2D it is different in the case of a k-fold rotation: the conjugate closure contains k rotations (including the identity) combined with all translations.

E(2) has quotient group O(2) / C_{k} and E^{+}(2) has quotient group SO(2) / C_{k} . For k = 2 this was already covered above.

== Reflection ==
The conjugates of a reflection are reflections with a translated, rotated, and reflected mirror plane. The conjugate closure of a singleton containing a reflection is the whole E(n).

== Rotoreflection ==
The left and also the right coset of a reflection in a plane combined with a rotation by a given angle about a perpendicular axis is the set of all combinations of a reflection in the same or a parallel plane, combined with a rotation by the same angle about the same or a parallel axis, preserving orientation

== Isometry groups ==
Two isometry groups are said to be equal up to conjugacy with respect to affine transformations if there is an affine transformation such that all elements of one group are obtained by taking the conjugates by that affine transformation of all elements of the other group. This applies for example for the symmetry groups of two patterns which are both of a particular wallpaper group type. If we would just consider conjugacy with respect to isometries, we would not allow for scaling, and in the case of a parallelogrammatic lattice, change of shape of the parallelogram. Note however that the conjugate with respect to an affine transformation of an isometry is in general not an isometry, although volume (in 2D: area) and orientation are preserved.

== Cyclic groups ==
Cyclic groups are Abelian, so the conjugate by every element of every element is the latter.

Z_{mn} / Z_{m} $\cong$ Z_{n}.

Z_{mn} is the direct product of Z_{m} and Z_{n} if and only if m and n are coprime. Thus e.g. Z_{12} is the direct product of Z_{3} and Z_{4}, but not of Z_{6} and Z_{2}.

== Dihedral groups ==
Consider the 2D isometry point group D_{n}. The conjugates of a rotation are the same and the inverse rotation. The conjugates of a reflection are the reflections rotated by any multiple of the full rotation unit. For odd n these are all reflections, for even n half of them.

This group, and more generally, abstract group Dih_{n}, has the normal subgroup Z_{m} for all divisors m of n, including n itself.

Additionally, Dih_{2n} has two normal subgroups isomorphic with Dih_{n}. They both contain the same group elements forming the group Z_{n}, but each has additionally one of the two conjugacy classes of Dih_{2n} \ Z_{2n}.

In fact:

Dih_{mn} / Z_{n} $\cong$ Dih_{n}
Dih_{2n} / Dih_{n} $\cong$ Z_{2}
Dih_{4n+2} $\cong$ Dih_{2n+1} × Z_{2}
