= Olinde Rodrigues =

French banker and mathematician (1795–1851)

Benjamin Olinde Rodrigues
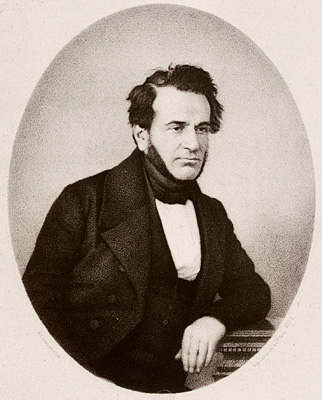
- Born: 6 October 1795; Bordeaux, France
- Died: 17 December 1851 (aged 56); Paris, France
- Education: University of Paris
- Scientific career
- Thesis: Mouvement de rotation d'un corps de révolution pesant (1815)

Benjamin Olinde Rodrigues (6 October 1795 – 17 December 1851), more commonly known as Olinde Rodrigues, was a French banker, mathematician, and social reformer. In mathematics Rodrigues is remembered for Rodrigues' rotation formula for vectors, the Rodrigues formula for the Legendre polynomials, and the Euler–Rodrigues parameters.

== Biography ==
Rodrigues was born into a well-to-do Sephardi Jewish family in Bordeaux. His family was of Portuguese-Jewish descent. He was awarded a doctorate in mathematics on 28 June 1815 by the University of Paris. His dissertation contains the result now called Rodrigues' formula.

After graduation, Rodrigues became a banker. A close associate of the Comte de Saint-Simon, Rodrigues continued, after Saint-Simon's death in 1825, to champion the older man's socialist ideals, a school of thought that came to be known as Saint-Simonianism. During this period, Rodrigues published writings on politics, social reform, and banking.

Rodrigues' 1840 paper developed new results on transformation groups. It uses three numbers to parameterize the entries of a rotation matrix using only rational functions. When converted to four parameters, this representation is equivalent to a unit quaternion, and describes the axis and angle of a rotation. In addition, he applied spherical trigonometry to relate changes in rotation axis and angle due to the composition of two rotations. This formula is a precursor to the quaternion product of William Rowan Hamilton. In 1846, Arthur Cayley acknowledged Euler's and Rodrigues' priority describing orthogonal transformations.

Rodrigues is credited as originating the idea of the artist as an avant-garde.

== Publications ==
- Mouvement de rotation d'un corps de révolution pesant, Paris, 1815
- "Mémoire sur l'attraction des sphéroïdes", Correspondance Sur l'École Impériale Polytechnique, vol. 3, pp. 361–385, 1815
- Théorie de la caisse hypothécaire, ou Examen du sort des emprunteurs, des porteurs d'obligations et des actionnaires de cet établissement, 1820
- Appel : religion saint-simonienne, 1831
- L'artiste, le savant et l'industriel: Dialogue, 1825
- Réunion générale de la famille : séances des 19 et 21 novembre, 1831
- Son premier écrit / Saint-Simon, 1832
- Le disciple de Saint-Simon aux Saint-Simoniens et au public, 1832
- Aux saint-simoniens, 13 février 1832 : bases de la loi morale proposées à l'acceptation des femmes, 1832
- Olinde Rodrigues à M. Michel Chevalier, rédacteur du "Globe" : religion saint-simonienne, 1832
- "Sur le nombre de manière de décomposer un Polygone en triangles au moyen de diagonales", Journal de Mathématiques Pures et Appliquées, vol. 3, pp. 547–548, 1838
- "Sur le nombre de manière de d'effectuer un produit de n facteurs", Journal de Mathématiques Pures et Appliquées, vol. 3, p. 549, 1838
- "Démonstration élémentaire et purement algébrique du développement d'un binome élevé à une puissance négative ou fractionnaire", Journal de Mathématiques Pures et Appliquées, vol. 3, pp. 550–551, 1838
- "Note sur les inversions, ou dérangements produits dans les permutations", Journal de Mathématiques Pures et Appliquées, vol. 4, pp. 236–240, 1839
- De l'organisation des banques à propos du projet de loi sur la Banque de France, 1840
- "Des lois géométriques qui régissent les déplacements d'un système solide dans l'espace: et de la variation des coordonnées provenant de ces déplacements considérés indépendamment des causes qui peuvent les produire", Journal de Mathématiques Pures et Appliquées, vol. 5, pp. 380–440, 1840
- Les Peuples et les diplomates. La Paix ou la guerre, 1840
- Œuvres de Saint-Simon, 1841
- Poésies sociales des ouvriers, réunies et publiées par Olinde Rodrigues, 1841
- "Du devéloppement des fonctions trigonométriques en produits de facteurs binomes", Journal de Mathématiques Pures et Appliquées, vol. 8, pp. 217–224, 1843
- "Note sur l’évaluation des arcs de cercle, en fonction linéaire des sinus ou des tangentes de fractions de ces arcs, décroissant en progression géométrique", Journal de Mathématiques Pures et Appliquées, vol. 8, pp. 225–234, 1843
- Théorie des banques, 1848
- De l'Organisation du suffrage universel, proposition d'un nouveau mode électoral par Olinde Rodrigues, 1848
- Organisation du travail, association du travail et du capital, 1848
- Organisation du travail, bases de l'organisation des banques, 1848

== See also ==
- Euler–Rodrigues formula
- Orthogonal polynomials
- Spherical harmonics

== Bibliography ==
- Altmann, Simon; Ortiz, Eduardo L. (2005). Mathematics and Social Utopias in France: Olinde Rodrigues and His Times. Providence RI: AMS. ISBN 978-0-821-83860-0.
- Louis Gabriel Michaud (1863) Biographie universelle ancienne et moderne
- Simon L. Altmann (1989). "Hamilton, Rodrigues and the quaternion scandal". Mathematics Magazine. Vol. 62, no. 5. pp. 291–308. doi:10.2307/2689481. JSTOR 2689481.
- Simon L. Altmann (2005). Rotations, Quaternions and Double Groups. Dover Publications. ISBN 978-0-486-44518-2.
- Jeremy J. Gray (1980) Olinde Rodrigues' paper of 1840 on Transformation Groups, Archive for History of Exact Sciences 21(4): 375–385, doi:10.1007/BF00595376.
