= MRP =

MRP may refer to:

== Business, economics and management ==
- Manufacturing resource planning, (MRP II), derived from/a followup to MRP/Material requirements planning
- Material requirements planning
- Maximum retail price, in India and Bangladesh
- Marginal revenue product, in the marginal revenue productivity theory of wages
- Market risk premium, a risk premium

== Politics ==
- Papuan People's Assembly (Majelis Rakyat Papua), a cultural assembly for the indigenous people in Papua, Indonesia
- Molotov–Ribbentrop Pact, a non-aggression pact between Nazi Germany and the Soviet Union
  - MRP-AEG, the Estonian Group on Publication of the Molotov–Ribbentrop Pact
- Mouvement Républicain Populaire (Popular Republican Movement), a political party during the Fourth French Republic

== Science and technology ==
- Micronized rubber powder
- Multidrug resistance protein
- RNase MRP, a ribonucleoprotein
- Multilevel regression with poststratification, used in opinion polling
- Modified Rodrigues parameters, a representation of a three-dimensional rotation
- Machine-readable passport
- Millisecond radio pulsar, a class of neutron stars

=== Computing ===
- Media Redundancy Protocol, allowing fast Ethernet recovery
- Metro Ring Protocol, proprietary networking protocol
- Multiple Registration Protocol in IEEE 802.1
- Managed Recovery Process in Oracle Data Guard

== Other uses ==
- Mission Raceway Park
- Mega Rice Project of Kalimantan, Indonesia
- Moorthorpe railway station (National Rail station code), England
- Monolithic Rail Platform, a gun part manufactured by Lewis Machine and Tool Company
- Master of Regional Planning, an urban planning qualification
- Mr Price Group, a major South African clothing and homeware retail chain
- Mike Pompeo (Michael Richard Pompeo), American politician
- Mike Pence (Michael Richard Pence), American politician
- MRP: Avi-Yonah, M., “Map of Roman Palestine” QDAP V, No. 4 (1936), 139-193. Egalement, Map of Roman Palestine, 2nd revised edition, Jerusalem, 1940. P.145
- Mohammad Reza Pahlavi, the last Shah of Iran
- Motion to revoke probation, a legal action
