= Rotation =

Movement of an object which leaves at least one point unchanged

A sphere rotating (spinning) about an axis

Rotation, also known as rotational motion or rotary motion, is the movement of an object that leaves at least one point unchanged. In 2 dimensions, a plane figure can rotate in either a clockwise or counterclockwise sense around a point called the center of rotation. In 3 dimensions, a solid figure rotates around an imaginary line called an axis of rotation.

The special case of a rotation with an internal axis passing through the body's own center of mass is known as a spin (or autorotation). In that case, the surface intersection of the internal spin axis can be called a pole; for example, Earth's rotation defines the geographical poles. A rotation around an axis completely external to the moving body is called a revolution (or orbit), as in a planetary orbit, e.g., Earth's orbit around the Sun. The ends of the external axis of revolution can be called the orbital poles.

Either type of rotation is involved in a corresponding type of angular velocity (spin angular velocity and orbital angular velocity) and angular momentum (spin angular momentum and orbital angular momentum).

== Mathematics ==
Rotation (angular displacement) of a planar figure around a point

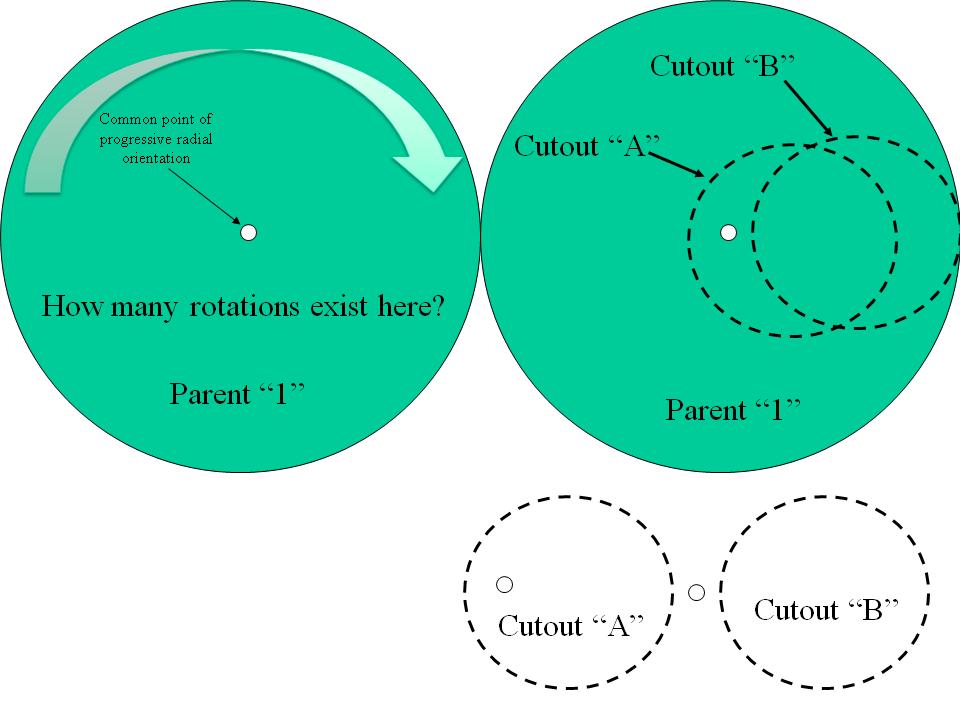
Rotational orbit v spin

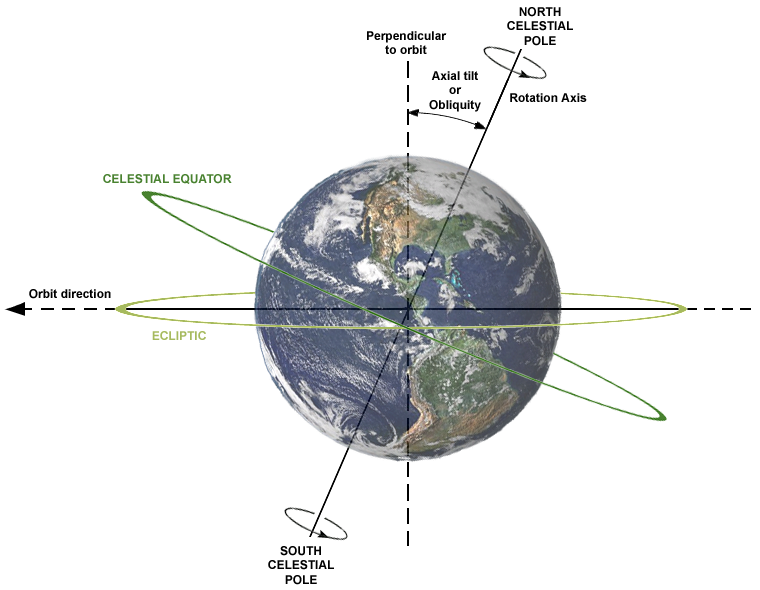
Relations between rotation axis, plane of orbit and axial tilt (for Earth)

Mathematically, a rotation is a rigid body movement which, unlike a translation, keeps at least one point fixed. This definition applies to rotations in two dimensions (in a plane), in which exactly one point is kept fixed; and also in three dimensions (in space), in which additional points may be kept fixed (as in rotation around a fixed axis, as infinite line).

All rigid body movements are rotations, translations, reflections, or some combination of the three.

A rotation is simply a progressive radial orientation to a common point. That common point lies within the axis of that motion. The axis is perpendicular to the plane of the motion.

If a rotation around a point or axis is followed by a second rotation around the same point/axis, a third rotation results. The reverse (inverse) of a rotation is also a rotation. Thus, the rotations around a point/axis form a group. However, a rotation around a point or axis and a rotation around a different point/axis may result in something other than a rotation, e.g. a translation.

Rotations around the x, y and z axes are called principal rotations. Rotation around any axis can be performed by taking a rotation around the x axis, followed by a rotation around the y axis, and followed by a rotation around the z axis. That is to say, any spatial rotation can be decomposed into a combination of principal rotations.

=== Fixed axis vs. fixed point ===
The combination of any sequence of rotations of an object in three dimensions about a fixed point is always equivalent to a rotation about an axis (which may be considered to be a rotation in the rotation plane that is perpendicular to that axis). Similarly, the rotation rate of an object in three dimensions at any instant is about some axis, although this axis may be changing over time.

In other than three dimensions, it does not make sense to describe a rotation as being around an axis, since more than one axis through the object may be kept fixed; instead, simple rotations are described as being in a plane. In four or more dimensions, a combination of two or more rotations about a plane is not in general a rotation in a single plane.

=== Axis of 2-dimensional rotations ===
2-dimensional rotations, unlike the 3-dimensional ones, possess no axis of rotation, only a point about which the rotation occurs. This is equivalent, for linear transformations, with saying that there is no direction in the plane which is kept unchanged by a 2-dimensional rotation, except, of course, the identity.

The question of the existence of such a direction is the question of existence of an eigenvector for the matrix A representing the rotation. Every 2D rotation around the origin through an angle $\theta$ in counterclockwise direction can be quite simply represented by the following matrix:

$$A =
\begin{bmatrix}
\cos \theta & -\sin \theta\\
\sin \theta &  \cos \theta
\end{bmatrix}$$

A standard eigenvalue determination leads to the characteristic equation

$$\lambda^2 -2 \lambda \cos \theta + 1 = 0,$$

which has

$$\cos \theta \pm i \sin \theta$$

as its eigenvalues. Therefore, there is no real eigenvalue whenever $\cos \theta \neq \pm 1$, meaning that no real vector in the plane is kept unchanged by A.

=== Rotation angle and axis in 3 dimensions ===
Knowing that the trace is an invariant, the rotation angle $\alpha$ for a proper orthogonal 3×3 rotation matrix $A$ is found by

$$\alpha=\cos^{-1}\left(\frac{A_{11}+A_{22}+A_{33}-1}{2}\right)$$

Using the principal arc-cosine, this formula gives a rotation angle satisfying $0\le\alpha\le 180^\circ$. The corresponding rotation axis must be defined to point in a direction that limits the rotation angle to not exceed 180 degrees. (This can always be done because any rotation of more than 180 degrees about an axis $m$ can always be written as a rotation having $0\le\alpha\le 180^\circ$ if the axis is replaced with $n=-m$.)

Every proper rotation $A$ in 3D space has an axis of rotation, which is defined such that any vector $v$ that is aligned with the rotation axis will not be affected by rotation. Accordingly, $A v = v$, and the rotation axis therefore corresponds to an eigenvector of the rotation matrix associated with an eigenvalue of 1. As long as the rotation angle $\alpha$ is nonzero (i.e., the rotation is not the identity tensor), there is one and only one such direction. Because A has only real components, there is at least one real eigenvalue, and the remaining two eigenvalues must be complex conjugates of each other (see Eigenvalues and eigenvectors#Eigenvalues and the characteristic polynomial). Knowing that 1 is an eigenvalue, it follows that the remaining two eigenvalues are complex conjugates of each other, but this does not imply that they are complex—they could be real with double multiplicity. In the degenerate case of a rotation angle $\alpha=180^\circ$, the remaining two eigenvalues are both equal to −1. In the degenerate case of a zero rotation angle, the rotation matrix is the identity, and all three eigenvalues are 1 (which is the only case for which the rotation axis is arbitrary).

A spectral analysis is not required to find the rotation axis. If $n$ denotes the unit eigenvector aligned with the rotation axis, and if $\alpha$ denotes the rotation angle, then it can be shown that $2\sin(\alpha)n=\{A_{32}-A_{23},A_{13}-A_{31},A_{21}-A_{12}\}$. Consequently, the expense of an eigenvalue analysis can be avoided by simply normalizing this vector if it has a nonzero magnitude. On the other hand, if this vector has a zero magnitude, it means that $\sin(\alpha)=0$. In other words, this vector will be zero if and only if the rotation angle is 0 or 180 degrees, and the rotation axis may be assigned in this case by normalizing any column of $A+I$ that has a nonzero magnitude.

This discussion applies to a proper rotation, and hence $\det A = 1$. Any improper orthogonal 3x3 matrix $B$ may be written as $B=-A$, in which $A$ is proper orthogonal. That is, any improper orthogonal 3x3 matrix may be decomposed as a proper rotation (from which an axis of rotation can be found as described above) followed by an inversion (multiplication by −1). It follows that the rotation axis of $A$ is also the eigenvector of $B$ corresponding to an eigenvalue of −1.

=== Rotation plane ===
As much as every tridimensional rotation has a rotation axis, also every tridimensional rotation has a plane, which is perpendicular to the rotation axis, and which is left invariant by the rotation. The rotation, restricted to this plane, is an ordinary 2D rotation.

The proof proceeds similarly to the above discussion. First, suppose that all eigenvalues of the 3D rotation matrix A are real. This means that there is an orthogonal basis, made by the corresponding eigenvectors (which are necessarily orthogonal), over which the effect of the rotation matrix is just stretching it. If we write A in this basis, it is diagonal; but a diagonal orthogonal matrix is made of just +1s and −1s in the diagonal entries. Therefore, we do not have a proper rotation, but either the identity or the result of a sequence of reflections.

It follows, then, that a proper rotation has some complex eigenvalue. Let v be the corresponding eigenvector. Then, as we showed in the previous topic, $\bar{v}$ is also an eigenvector, and $v + \bar{v}$ and $i(v - \bar{v})$ are such that their scalar product vanishes:

$$i (v^\text{T} + \bar{v}^\text{T})(v - \bar{v}) = i (v^\text{T} v - \bar{v}^\text{T} \bar{v} + \bar{v}^\text{T} v - v^\text{T} \bar{v} ) = 0$$

because, since $\bar{v}^\text{T} \bar{v}$ is real, it equals its complex conjugate $v^\text{T} v$, and $\bar{v}^\text{T} v$ and $v^\text{T} \bar{v}$ are both representations of the same scalar product between $v$ and $\bar{v}$.

This means $v + \bar{v}$ and $i(v - \bar{v})$ are orthogonal vectors. Also, they are both real vectors by construction. These vectors span the same subspace as $v$ and $\bar{v}$, which is an invariant subspace under the application of A. Therefore, they span an invariant plane.

This plane is orthogonal to the invariant axis, which corresponds to the remaining eigenvector of A, with eigenvalue 1, because of the orthogonality of the eigenvectors of A.

=== Rotation of vectors ===
A vector is said to be rotating if it changes its orientation. This effect is generally only accompanied when its rate of change vector has non-zero perpendicular component to the original vector. This can be shown to be the case by considering a vector $\vec A$ which is parameterized by some variable $t$ for which:

${d|\vec A|^2 \over dt}={d(\vec A\cdot \vec A) \over dt} \Rightarrow {d|\vec A| \over dt}={d\vec A \over dt}\cdot \hat{A}$

Which also gives a relation of rate of change of unit vector by taking $\vec A$, to be such a vector:
$${d\hat A \over dt}\cdot \hat A = 0$$
showing that ${d\hat A \over dt}$ vector is perpendicular to the vector, $\vec A$.

From:

${d\vec A \over dt} = {d(|\vec A|\hat A) \over dt} = {d|\vec A| \over dt}\hat{A}+|\vec A|\left({d\hat A \over dt}\right)$,

since the first term is parallel to $\vec A$ and the second perpendicular to it, we can conclude in general that the parallel and perpendicular components of rate of change of a vector independently influence only the magnitude or orientation of the vector respectively. Hence, a rotating vector always has a non-zero perpendicular component of its rate of change vector against the vector itself.

=== In higher dimensions ===
As dimensions increase the number of rotation vectors increases. Along a four dimensional space (a hypervolume), rotations occur along x, y, z, and w axis. An object rotated on a w axis intersects through various volumes, where each intersection is equal to a self contained volume at an angle. This gives way to a new axis of rotation in a 4d hypervolume, where a 3D object can be rotated perpendicular to the z axis.

== Physics ==
The speed of rotation is given by the angular frequency (rad/s) or frequency (turns per time), or period (seconds, days, etc.). The time-rate of change of angular frequency is angular acceleration (rad/s^{2}), caused by torque. The ratio of torque τ to the angular acceleration α is given by the moment of inertia:
$$I = \frac{\tau}{\alpha}.$$

The angular velocity vector (an axial vector) also describes the direction of the axis of rotation. Similarly, the torque is an axial vector.

The physics of the rotation around a fixed axis is mathematically described with the axis–angle representation of rotations. According to the right-hand rule, the direction away from the observer is associated with clockwise rotation and the direction towards the observer with counterclockwise rotation, like a screw.

=== Circular motion ===
The motion on the left, an example of curvilinear translation, cannot be treated as rotation since there is no change in orientation, whereas the right can be treated as rotation.

It is possible for objects to have periodic circular trajectories without changing their orientation. These types of motion are treated under circular motion instead of rotation, more specifically as a curvilinear translation. Since translation involves displacement of rigid bodies while preserving the orientation of the body, in the case of curvilinear translation, all the points have the same instantaneous velocity whereas relative motion can only be observed in motions involving rotation.

In rotation, the orientation of the object changes and the change in orientation is independent of the observers whose frames of reference have constant relative orientation over time. By Euler's theorem, any change in orientation can be described by rotation about an axis through a chosen reference point. Hence, the distinction between rotation and circular motion can be made by requiring an instantaneous axis for rotation, a line passing through instantaneous center of circle and perpendicular to the plane of motion. In the example depicting curvilinear translation, the center of circles for the motion lie on a straight line but it is parallel to the plane of motion and hence does not resolve to an axis of rotation. In contrast, a rotating body will always have its instantaneous axis of zero velocity, perpendicular to the plane of motion.

More generally, due to Chasles' theorem, any motion of rigid bodies can be treated as a composition of rotation and translation, called general plane motion. A simple example of pure rotation is considered in rotation around a fixed axis.

=== Euler rotations ===
Euler rotations of the Earth: intrinsic (green), precession (blue) and nutation (red)

Euler rotations provide an alternative description of a rotation. It is a composition of three rotations defined as the movement obtained by changing one of the Euler angles while leaving the other two constant. Euler rotations are never expressed in terms of the external frame, or in terms of the co-moving rotated body frame, but in a mixture. They constitute a mixed axes of rotation system, where the first angle moves the line of nodes around the external axis z, the second rotates around the line of nodes and the third one is an intrinsic rotation around an axis fixed in the body that moves.

These rotations are called precession, nutation, and intrinsic rotation.

=== Rotational invariance ===
A system which behaves the same regardless of how it is oriented in space is said to be rotationally invariant. According to Noether's theorem, if the action (the integral over time of its Lagrangian) of a physical system is invariant under rotation, then angular momentum is conserved.

== Astronomy ==
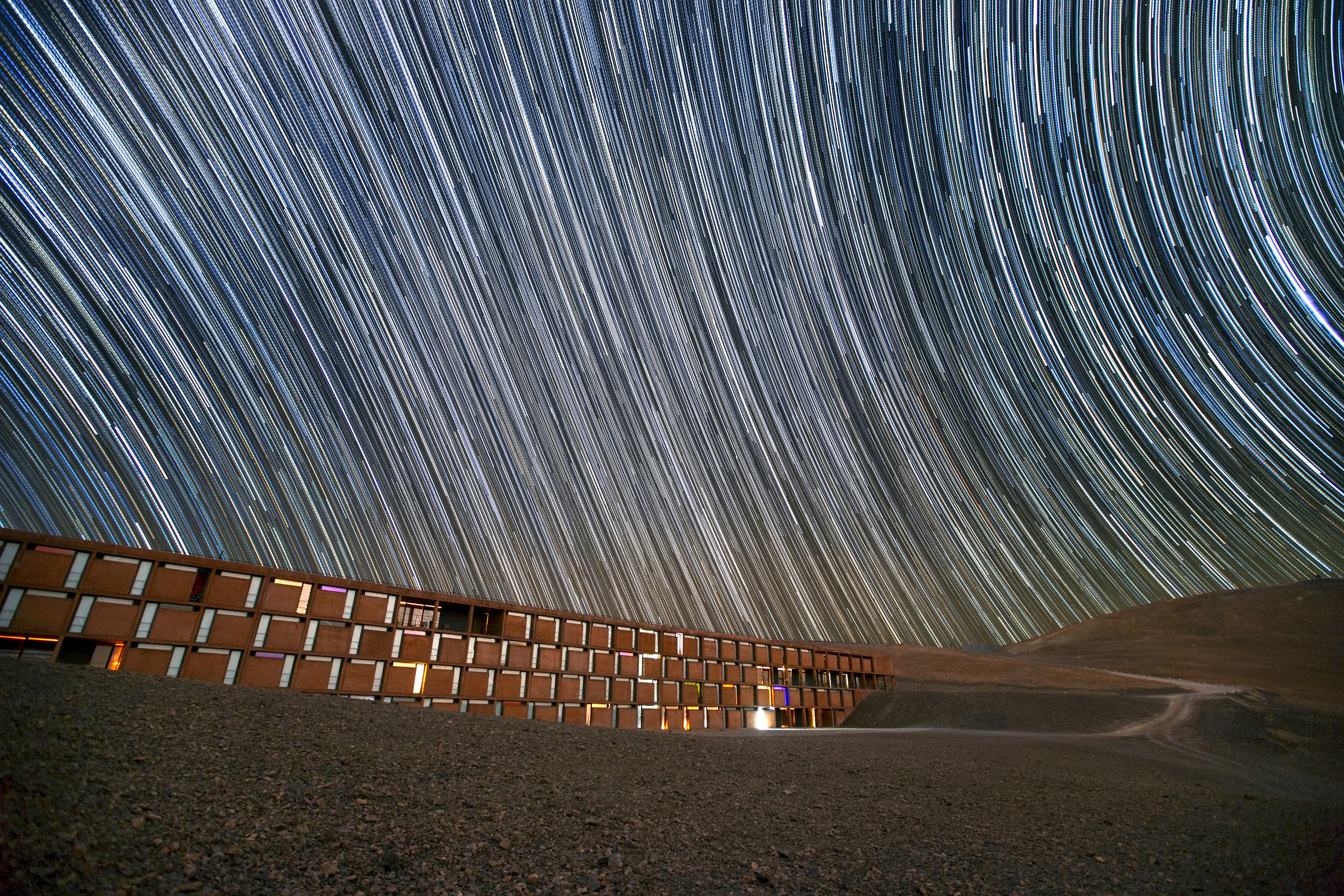
Star trails caused by the Earth's rotation during the camera's long exposure time

In astronomy, rotation is a commonly observed phenomenon; it includes both spin (auto-rotation) and orbital revolution.

=== Black holes ===
The rotation or spin of a black hole is its only astronomical property other than its mass and charge. The rotation stores enormous amounts of energy, powering relativistic jets of ionized particles extending thousands of parsecs into space and lasting hundreds of millions of years. The jets are strong enough to alter the evolution of galaxies. Black holes spin much faster than neutron stars despite their similar origin in supernova, suggesting that the spinning magnetic field of the neutron star transfers rotational energy to ionized gases exiting the nova explosion.

=== Spin ===
Stars, planets and similar bodies may spin around on their axes. The rotation rate of planets in the Solar System was first measured by tracking visual features. Stellar rotation is measured through Doppler shift or by tracking active surface features. An example is sunspots, which rotate around the Sun at the same velocity as the outer gases that make up the Sun.

Under some circumstances orbiting bodies may lock their spin rotation to their orbital rotation around a larger body. This effect is called tidal locking; the Moon is tidal-locked to the Earth.

This rotation induces a centrifugal acceleration in the reference frame of the Earth which slightly counteracts the effect of gravitation the closer one is to the equator. Earth's gravity combines both mass effects such that an object weighs slightly less at the equator than at the poles. Another is that over time the Earth is slightly deformed into an oblate spheroid; a similar equatorial bulge develops for other planets.

Another consequence of the rotation of a planet are the phenomena of precession and nutation. Like a gyroscope, the overall effect is a slight "wobble" in the movement of the axis of a planet. Currently the tilt of the Earth's axis to its orbital plane (obliquity of the ecliptic) is 23.44 degrees, but this angle changes slowly (over thousands of years).

=== Retrograde rotation ===
Most planets in the Solar System, including Earth, spin in the same direction as they orbit the Sun. The exceptions are Venus and Uranus. Venus may be thought of as rotating slowly backward (or being "upside down"). Uranus rotates nearly on its side relative to its orbit. Current speculation is that Uranus started off with a typical prograde orientation and was knocked on its side by a large impact early in its history. The dwarf planet Pluto (formerly considered a planet) is anomalous in several ways, including that it also rotates on its side.

=== Revolution ===
While revolution is often used as a synonym for rotation, in many fields, particularly astronomy and related fields, revolution, often referred to as orbital revolution for clarity, is used when one body moves around another while rotation is used to mean the movement around an axis. Moons revolve around their planets, planets revolve about their stars (such as the Earth around the Sun); and stars slowly revolve about their galaxial centers. The motion of the components of galaxies is complex, but it usually includes a rotation component.

== Applied ==
=== Flight dynamics ===
The principal axes of rotation in space

In flight dynamics, the principal rotations described with Euler angles above are known as pitch, roll and yaw. The term rotation is also used in aviation to refer to the upward pitch (nose moves up) of an aircraft, particularly when starting the climb after takeoff.

Principal rotations have the advantage of modelling a number of physical systems such as gimbals, and joysticks, so are easily visualised, and are a very compact way of storing a rotation. But they are difficult to use in calculations as even simple operations like combining rotations are expensive to do, and suffer from a form of gimbal lock where the angles cannot be uniquely calculated for certain rotations.

==== Arrow-flight ====
Different roughness on each side of arrow fletching produces spin in arrow-flight. This rotation improves the stability of the arrow in flight and the precision of the trajectory.

=== Amusement rides ===
Many amusement rides provide rotation. A Ferris wheel has a horizontal central axis, and parallel axes for each gondola, where the rotation is opposite, by gravity or mechanically. As a result, at any time the orientation of the gondola is upright (not rotated), just translated. The tip of the translation vector describes a circle. A carousel provides rotation about a vertical axis. Many rides provide a combination of rotations about several axes. In Chair-O-Planes the rotation about the vertical axis is provided mechanically, while the rotation about the horizontal axis is due to the centripetal force. In roller coaster inversions the rotation about the horizontal axis is one or more full cycles, where inertia keeps people in their seats.

=== Sports ===
Rotation of a ball or other object, usually called spin, plays a role in many sports, including topspin and backspin in tennis, English, follow and draw in billiards and pool, curve balls in baseball, spin bowling in cricket, flying disc sports, etc. Table tennis paddles are manufactured with different surface characteristics to allow the player to impart a greater or lesser amount of spin to the ball.

Rotation of a player one or more times around a vertical axis may be called spin in figure skating, twirling (of the baton or the performer) in baton twirling, or 360, 540, 720, etc. in snowboarding, etc. Rotation of a player or performer one or more times around a horizontal axis may be called a flip, roll, somersault, heli, etc. in gymnastics, waterskiing, or many other sports, or a one-and-a-half, two-and-a-half, gainer (starting facing away from the water), etc. in diving, etc. A combination of vertical and horizontal rotation (back flip with 360°) is called a möbius in waterskiing freestyle jumping.

Rotation of a player around a vertical axis, generally between 180 and 360 degrees, may be called a spin move and is used as a deceptive or avoidance manoeuvre, or in an attempt to play, pass, or receive a ball or puck, etc., or to afford a player a view of the goal or other players. It is often seen in hockey, basketball, football of various codes, tennis, etc.

== See also ==
- Absolute rotation – Rotation independent of any external reference
- Charybdis
- Circular motion
- Cyclone – large scale rotating air mass
- Euler angle
- Instant centre of rotation – instantaneously fixed point on an arbitrarily moving rigid body
- Mach's principle – speculative hypothesis that a physical law relates the motion of the distant stars to the local inertial frame
- Orientation (geometry)
- Point reflection
- Rolling – motion of two objects in contact with each-other without sliding
- Rotation (quantity) – a unitless scalar representing the number of rotations
- Rotation around a fixed axis
- Rotation formalisms in three dimensions
- rotation group SO(3)
- Rotating locomotion in living systems
- Spinning top – spinning toy
- Sufi whirling
- Vortex
