= Lehigh Technologies =

- Type: Private
- Industry: Specialty chemicals
- Founded: 2003
- Headquarters: Atlanta, Georgia
- Area served: Worldwide
- Key people: William Paul Crehan (CEO)
- Products: Micronized rubber powder
- Number of employees: 50-100
- Website: lehightechnologies.com

Lehigh Technologies is a specialty materials company that manufactures micronized rubber powders (MRP). Based in Atlanta, Georgia, Lehigh Technologies operates a MRP manufacturing plant at its headquarters, with an annual production capacity of more than 100 million pounds. Lehigh also operates a MRP research, and development facility, its Application & Development Center.

== History and growth ==
Lehigh Technologies has been manufacturing MRP at its commercial plant since 2007. According to Lehigh, the company has demonstrated steady growth since it began manufacturing MRP at commercial scale.

In 2010, Lehigh was selected as a Technology Pioneer by the World Economic Forum (WEF). The awards program recognizes companies from around the world that are involved in the design, development and deployment of new technologies that are set to have a significant impact on business and society.

In June 2011, Lehigh announced that more than 100 million tires on the road had been manufactured using the company's MRP. In 2014, the company announced that more than 250 million tires produced to date had incorporated MRP.

In October 2017, Lehigh Technologies was acquired by Michelin as part of Michelin's "4R" circular economy strategy.

== Research and development ==
In November 2010, Lehigh expanded its in-house capabilities with the launch of the Application & Development Center (ADC), a dedicated research and development facility staffed by a team of industry professionals. The stated mission of the ADC is to develop new applications for MRP and to accelerate adoption of existing MRP applications by improving understanding of MRP chemistry, providing expert advice for new material formulations that incorporate MRP, and developing new materials based on MRP.

In January 2014, Lehigh announced an expansion of its ADC that includes the hiring of new technical staff and investment in new mixing and analytical equipment. According to Lehigh, this expansion improves the ADC's ability to develop functional materials based on MRP.

== Operations ==
In addition to its production facility in Atlanta, Lehigh has developed a network of partners and distributors.

=== Asia ===
Lehigh partnered with Connell Brothers Corporation (CBC), the largest distributor of specialty chemicals and ingredients in Asia-Pacific, to market its MRP in Japan, In 2014, Lehigh announced an expanded partnership with CBC, aimed at broadening industry outreach, supply chain efficiency and technical support in Japan, as well as introducing MRP to South Korea and Southeast Asia.

In September 2014, Lehigh announced the closing of an $8 million fundraise with JSR Corporation, a $4 billion specialty chemicals company based in Japan, to support the company's geographic expansion and technology roadmap for MRP in the region.

=== South America ===
In October 2011, Lehigh expanded into Brazil with the appointment of a country manager. In December 2012, Lehigh announced a partnership with Andes Chemical Corporation to market MRP in Central America.

=== Europe ===
In September 2012, Lehigh partnered with HERA Holding, a Spanish waste-to-resource company, to market MRP to the tire, consumer, and industrial plastics and coatings industries in Europe. In 2018 Lehigh and Hera announced the completion and startup of a manufacturing facility in Spain to supply EMEA markets.

== Investors ==
Since 2008, Lehigh has raised more than $50 million from investors that include Kleiner Perkins Caufield & Byers, Index Ventures, Leaf Clean Energy and NGP Energy Technology Partners.

== Technology ==
Lehigh has commercialized a proprietary cryogenic turbo mill technology that transforms end-of-life tires and post-industrial rubber materials into micronized rubber powders. Lehigh produces MRP from vulcanized elastomeric material, most often end-of-life tire material. However, it can also be produced from post-industrial nitrile rubber, ethylene propylene diene monomer (EPDM), butyl, and natural rubber compounds.

=== Products ===
Lehigh's MRPs are available in two product lines, PolyDyne and MicroDyne. Industries incorporating MRP into their products include tire, automotive, construction, industrial components and consumer products. It is also used as an additive in tires, plastics, asphalt, coatings, and sealants. MRP can also be incorporated into prime or recycled grade polypropylene (PP), high-density polyethylene (HDPE) and nylons. Additionally, the incorporation of MRPs in thermoplastic elastomers (TPE) and thermoplastic vulcanizates (TPV) makes it a feasible ingredient for automotive and building and construction applications.

The particle size distributions of Lehigh's MRP typically range from 830 μm (20 mesh) to 50 μm (300 mesh), and its MRP is free of foreign particulates, such as metal and fiber.

=== Third-Generation Technology ===
Lehigh claims that its cryogenic turbo mill technology represents an evolution over previous post-manufactured rubber technologies. The most common rubber processing technology converts end-of-life tire and post-industrial rubber material into rubber chips that are typically one inch or larger. These chips are then used in tire-derived fuel and civil engineering projects. A second-generation processing technology converts end-of-life tire and rubber material into crumb rubber, also known as ground tire rubber (GTR). GTR typically comprises chips between one inch and 30 mesh in size, with the associated fiber and steel mostly removed. This material is used in asphalt, as garden mulch and in playgrounds.

Because of the material's smaller size, Lehigh markets its micrometer-scale MRP as a third-generation rubber processing technology. MRP's size and composition enables it to be incorporated into advanced and higher-value applications.

== Sustainability ==
Lehigh's MRP is used as a compound extender to replace natural rubber and synthetic polymers, as well as to act as a process aid in material production. Lehigh claims that because it replaces commodity-priced rubber- and oil-based feedstocks, MRP can reduce formulation costs. The company has asserted that MRP can offer up to 50 percent cost savings over virgin raw materials in some cases.

Because it is derived from end-of-life materials, MRP can also improve the sustainability, and in some cases the performance, of the compounds in which it is used. For example, Lehigh has stated that the smaller particle sizes of MRP increase the impact strength of certain plastic compositions. However, in all applications, the particle size and loading levels depend on the target application.

== See also ==
- Micronized rubber powder
- Speciality chemicals
