= Instant centre of rotation =

Point fixed to a body undergoing planar movement

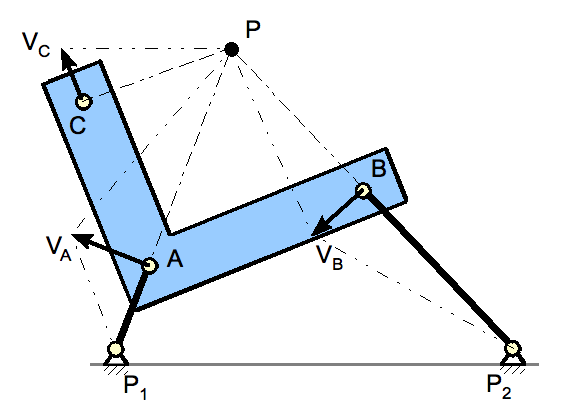
Sketch 1: Instantaneous center P of a moving plane

The instant center of rotation (also known as instantaneous velocity center, instantaneous center, or pole of planar displacement) of a body undergoing planar movement is a point that has zero velocity at a particular instant of time. At this instant, the velocity vectors of the other points in the body generate a circular displacement field around this center of rotation which is identical to what is generated by a pure rotation.

Planar movement of a body is often described using a plane figure moving in a two-dimensional plane. The instant center is the point in the moving plane around which all other points are rotating at a specific instant of time.

The continuous movement of a plane has an instant center for every value of the time parameter. This generates a curve called the moving centrode. The points in the fixed plane corresponding to these instant centers form the fixed centrode.

The generalization of this concept to 3-dimensional space is that of a twist around a screw. The screw has an axis which is a line in 3D space (not necessarily through the origin), the axis of rotation; the screw also has a finite pitch (a fixed translation along its axis corresponding to a rotation about the screw axis).

== Pole of a planar displacement ==
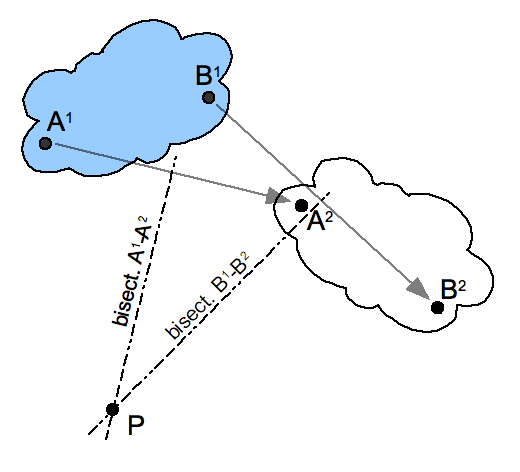
Sketch 2: Pole of a planar displacement

The instant center can be considered the limiting case of the pole of a planar displacement.

The planar displacement of a body from position 1 to position 2 is defined by the combination of a planar rotation and planar translation. For any planar displacement there is a point in the moving body that is in the same place before and after the displacement. The displacement can be viewed as a rotation around this pole.

Construction for the pole of a planar displacement

First, select two points A and B in the moving body and locate the corresponding points in the two positions; see the illustration. Construct the perpendicular bisectors to the two segments A^{1}A^{2} and B^{1}B^{2}. The intersection P of these two bisectors is the pole of the planar displacement. Notice that A^{1} and A^{2} lie on a circle around P. This is true for the corresponding positions of every point in the body.

If the two positions of a body are separated by an instant of time in a planar movement, then the pole of a displacement becomes the instant center. In this case, the segments constructed between the instantaneous positions of the points A and B become the velocity vectors V_{A} and V_{B}. The lines perpendicular to these velocity vectors intersect in the instant center.

The algebraic construction of the Cartesian coordinates $\left(P_x, P_y\right)$ can be arranged as follows: The midpoint between $A^1$ and $A^2$ has the Cartesian coordinates

$$A^m_x = \frac{1}{2}\left(A^1_x + A^2_x\right); \quad
A^m_y = \frac{1}{2}\left(A^1_y + A^2_y\right),$$

and the midpoint between $B^1$ and $B^2$ has the Cartesian coordinates

$$B^m_x = \frac{1}{2}\left(B^1_x + B^2_x\right); \quad
B^m_y = \frac{1}{2}\left(B^1_y + B^2_y\right).$$

The two angles from $A^1$ to $A^2$ and from $B^1$ to $B^2$ measured counter-clockwise relative to the horizontal are determined by

$$\tan \tau_A = \frac{A^2_y - A^1_y}{A^2_x - A^1_x},\quad
\tan \tau_B = \frac{B^2_y - B^1_y}{B^2_x - B^1_x}$$

Find the position of $P\left(P_x, P_y\right)$

Method 1:

Taking the correct branches of the tangent. Let the center $\left(P_x, P_y\right)$ of the rotation have distances $d_A$ and $d_B$ to the two midpoints. Assuming clockwise rotation (otherwise switch the sign of $\pi/2$):

$$\begin{align}
P_x &= A^m_x + d_A \cos\left(\tau_A - \frac{\pi}{2}\right)  \\
&= B^m_x + d_B \cos\left(\tau_B - \frac{\pi}{2}\right) ;\\
P_y &= A^m_y + d_A \sin\left(\tau_A - \frac{\pi}{2}\right)  \\
&= B^m_y + d_B \sin\left(\tau_B - \frac{\pi}{2}\right) .
\end{align}$$

Rewrite this as a 4 × 4 inhomogeneous system of linear equations with 4 unknowns (the two distances $d$ and the two coordinates $P$ of the center):

$$\begin{pmatrix}
1 & 0 & -\sin\tau_A &           0 \\
1 & 0 &           0 & -\sin\tau_B \\
0 & 1 &  \cos\tau_A &           0 \\
0 & 1 &           0 &  \cos\tau_B
\end{pmatrix}
\begin{pmatrix} P_x \\ P_y \\ d_A \\ d_B \end{pmatrix} =
\begin{pmatrix} A^m_x \\ B^m_x \\ A^m_y \\ B^m_y \end{pmatrix}.$$

The coordinates of the center of the rotation are the first two components of the solution vector

$$\begin{pmatrix} P_x \\ P_y \\ d_A \\ d_B \end{pmatrix} =
\frac{1}{\sin\left(\tau_A - \tau_B\right)}
\begin{pmatrix}
\left(B^m_y - A^m_y\right)\sin\tau_A\sin\tau_B + B^m_x \sin\tau_A\cos\tau_B - A^m_x \cos\tau_A\sin\tau_B \\
\left(A^m_x - B^m_x\right)\cos\tau_A\cos\tau_B + A^m_y \sin\tau_A\cos\tau_B - B^m_y \cos\tau_A\sin\tau_B \\
\left(B^m_x - A^m_x\right)\cos\tau_B + \left(B^m_y - A^m_y\right)\sin\tau_B \\
\left(B^m_x - A^m_x\right)\cos\tau_A + \left(B^m_y - A^m_y\right)\sin\tau_A \\
\end{pmatrix}.$$

Method 2:

Find equations of the bisectors of two segments A^{1}A^{2} and B^{1}B^{2} as follows

The equation of a straight line in point- slope form is: $y - y_0 = m (x -x_0)$ where $(x_0,y_0)$ is the point and $m$ is the slope.

The equation of the bisector of A^{1}A^{2} is $y - A^m_y = \tan \tau_A\left(x - A^m_x\right)$

The equation of the bisector of B^{1}B^{2} is $y - B^m_y = \tan \tau_B\left(x - B^m_x\right)$

These two bisectors intersect at $P\left(P_x, P_y\right)$ so a system of 2 equations with 2 unknowns and coefficients can be written

$$\begin{cases}
P_y - A^m_y = \tan \tau_A\left(P_x - A^m_x\right)\\
P_y - B^m_y = \tan \tau_B\left(P_x - B^m_x\right)
\end{cases}$$

The solution of this system is

$P_x = \frac{B^m_y - A^m_y +A^m_x\tan \tau_A - B^m_x\tan \tau_B}{\tan \tau_A-\tan \tau_B},\qquad P_y = \frac{B^m_y - A^m_y +\tan \tau_A \left(A^m_x - B^m_x\right)}{\tan \tau_A-\tan \tau_B} + B^m_y$

Pure translation

If the displacement between two positions is a pure translation, then the perpendicular bisectors of the segments A^{1}B^{1} and A^{2}B^{2} form parallel lines. These lines are considered to intersect at a point on the line at infinity, thus the pole of this planar displacement is said to "lie at infinity" in the direction of the perpendicular bisectors.

In the limit, pure translation becomes planar movement with point velocity vectors that are parallel. In this case, the instant center is said to lie at infinity in the direction perpendicular to the velocity vectors.

== Instant center of a wheel rolling without slipping ==
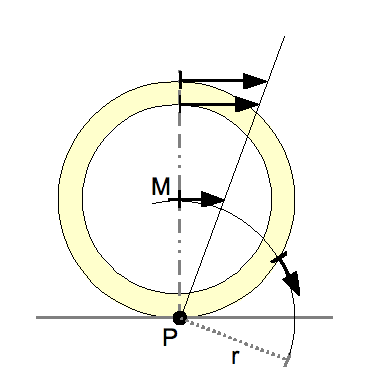
Sketch 3: Rolling wheel.

Instant centre of rotation of a rolling wheel broken down into points. By breaking down the rolling wheel into several points, it can be more easily seen how all points of the wheel rotate around a single point at each instant. This point is the instant centre of rotation, shown in black.

Consider the planar movement of a circular wheel rolling without slipping on a linear road; see sketch 3. The wheel rotates around its axis M, which translates in a direction parallel to the road. The point of contact P of the wheel with road does not slip, which means the point P has zero velocity with respect to the road. Thus, at the instant the point P on the wheel comes in contact with the road it becomes an instant center.

The set of points of the moving wheel that become instant centers is the circle itself, which defines the moving centrode. The points in the fixed plane that correspond to these instant centers is the line of the road, which defines the fixed centrode.

The velocity vector of a point A in the wheel is perpendicular to the segment AP and is proportional to the length of this segment. In particular, the velocities of points in the wheel are determined by the angular velocity of the wheel in rotation around P. The velocity vectors of a number of points are illustrated in sketch 3 and can be calculated using the following equation:

$$\vec v = \vec \omega \times \vec r_{A}$$

where $\vec v$ is velocity of point A, $\vec \omega$ angular velocity of wheel and $\vec r_{A}$ vector from point P to A.

The further a point in the wheel is from the instant center P, the proportionally larger its speed. Therefore, the point at the top of the wheel moves in the same direction as the center M of the wheel, but twice as fast, since it is twice the distance away from P. All points that are a distance equal to the radius of the wheel 'r' from point P move at the same speed as the point M but in different directions. This is shown for a point on the wheel that has the same speed as M but moves in the direction tangent to the circle around P.

== Relative center of rotation for two contacting planar bodies ==
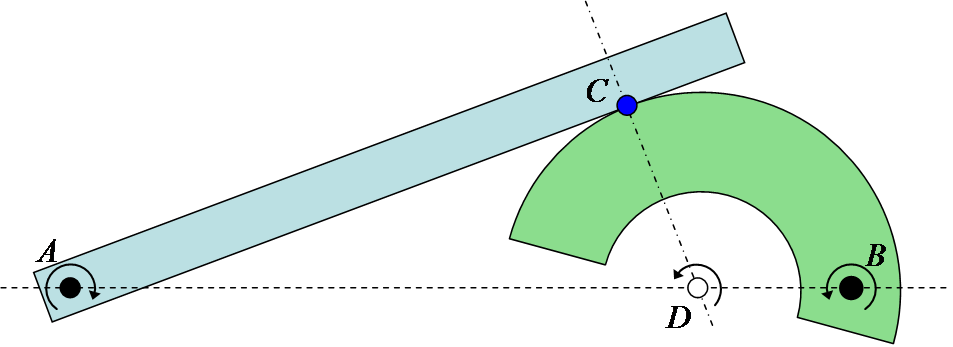
Sketch 4: Example relative center of rotation. Two bodies in contact at C, one rotating about A and the other about B must have a relative center of rotation somewhere along the line AB. Since the parts cannot interpenetrate the relative rotation center must also be along the normal direction to the contact and through C. The only possible solution is if the relative center is at D.

If two planar rigid bodies are in contact, and each body has its own distinct center of rotation, then the relative center of rotation between the bodies has to lie somewhere on the line connecting the two centers. This is due to the Aronhold-Kennedy Theorem.

In addition, pure rolling can only exist when the instant center of rotation is coincident with the point of contact between the two bodies since this point of contact is required to have zero velocity (as seen above with the wheel on the road). Therefore, it is only when the point of contact goes through the line connecting the two inertial rotation centers that pure rolling can be achieved. This is known in involute gear design as the pitch point, where there is no relative sliding between the gears. In fact, the gearing ratio between the two rotating parts is found by the ratio of the two distances to the relative center. In the example in Sketch 4 the gearing ratio is $\gamma = \frac{AD}{BD}$

== Instant center of rotation and mechanisms ==
Sketch 1 above shows a four-bar linkage where a number of instant centers of rotation are illustrated. The rigid body noted by the letters BAC is connected with links P_{1}-A and P_{2}-B to a base or frame.

The three moving parts of this mechanism (the base is not moving) are: link P_{1}-A, link P_{2}-B, and body BAC. For each of these three parts an instant center of rotation may be determined.

Considering first link P_{1}-A: all points on this link, including point A, rotate around point P_{1}. Since P_{1} is the only point not moving in the given plane it may be called the instant center of rotation for this link. Point A, at distance P_{1}-A from P_{1}, moves in a circular motion in a direction perpendicular to the link P_{1}-A, as indicated by vector V_{A}.

The same applies to link P_{2}-B: point P_{2} is the instant center of rotation for this link and point B moves in the direction as indicated by vector V_{B}.

For determining the instant center of rotation of the third element of the linkage, the body BAC, the two points A and B are used because its moving characteristics are known, as derived from the information about the links P_{1}-A and P_{2}-B.

The direction of speed of point A is indicated by vector V_{A}. Its instant center of rotation must be perpendicular to this vector (as V_{A} is tangentially located on the circumference of a circle). The only line that fills the requirement is a line colinear with link P_{1}-A. Somewhere on this line there is a point P, the instant center of rotation for the body BAC.

What applies to point A also applies to point B, therefore this instant center of rotation P is located on a line perpendicular to vector V_{B}, a line colinear with link P_{2}-B. Therefore, the instant center of rotation P of body BAC is the point where the lines through P_{1}-A and P_{2}-B cross.

Since this instant center of rotation P is the center for all points on the body BAC for any random point, say point C, the speed and direction of movement may be determined: connect P to C. The direction of movement of point C is perpendicular to this connection. The speed is proportional to the distance to point P.

Continuing this approach with the two links P_{1}-A and P_{2}-B rotating around their own instant centers of rotation the centrode for instant center of rotation P may be determined. From this the path of movement for C or any other point on body BAC may be determined.

== Examples of application ==
In biomechanical research the instant center of rotation is observed for the functioning of the joints in the upper and lower extremities. For example, in analysing the knee, ankle, or shoulder joints. Such knowledge assists in developing artificial joints and prosthesis, such as elbow or finger joints.

Study of the joints of horses: "...velocity vectors determined from the instant centers of rotation indicated that the joint surfaces slide on each other."

Studies on turning a vessel moving through water.

The braking characteristics of a car may be improved by varying the design of a brake pedal mechanism.

Designing the suspension of a bicycle, or of a car.

In the case of the coupler link in a four-bar linkage, such as a double wishbone suspension in front view, the perpendiculars to the velocity lie along the links joining the grounded link to the coupler link. This construction is used to establish the kinematic roll center of the suspension.

== See also ==
- Angular velocity
- Burmester's theory
- Centrode
- Point reflection group
- Rigid body
- Roll center
- Rotation around a fixed axis
- Two-dimensional rotation
