= Centrode =

Path traced by the point fixed to a body undergoing planar movement

Interaction of the fixed centrode (pink) and moving centrode (orange) of a 4-bar linkage: The indigo dot draws both centrodes, and also indicates where the moving centrode is in contact with and is rolling around the fixed centrode.

A centrode, in kinematics, is the path traced by the instantaneous center of rotation of a rigid plane figure moving in a plane. There are two types of centrodes: a space or fixed centrode, and a body or moving centrode. The moving centrode rolls without slip on the fixed centrode.

== Gallery ==
Construction of the fixed centrode for a 4-bar linkage:
The cyan link indicates the link the centrode (pink) is drawn relative to.

Construction of the moving centrode for a 4-bar linkage:
The cyan link indicates the link the centrode (orange) is drawn relative to. An additional diagram is shown on the right to show the cyan link fixed in place for reference.

== See also ==
- Four-bar linkage
