= Conformal rotation vector =

Representation of a three-dimensional rotation

The conformal rotation vector, whose coordinates are also known as modified Rodrigues parameters or Wiener–Milenkovic parameters, is a three-dimensional vector representing a three-dimensional rotation or orientation. It is the stereographic projection of a versor (unit quaternion) onto the pure-imaginary hyperplane. It was first described by Thomas Wiener (1962), called the conformal rotation vector by Veljko Milenkovic (1982), and named the modified Rodrigues vector by Malcolm Shuster (1993). It is related to the Rodrigues vector first described by Olinde Rodrigues (1840) and called by Josiah Gibbs (1884) the vector semitangent of version, whose coordinates are called Rodrigues parameters or Euler–Rodrigues parameters.
