= Micronized rubber powder =

Micronized rubber powder (MRP) is classified as fine, dry, powdered elastomeric crumb rubber in which a significant proportion of particles are less than 100 μm and free of foreign particulates (metal, fiber, etc.). MRP particle size distributions typically range from 180 μm to 10 μm. Narrower distributions can be achieved depending on the classification technology.

== MRP source materials ==
MRP is typically made from vulcanized elastomeric material, most often from end-of-life tire material, but can also be produced from post-industrial nitrile rubber, ethylene propylene diene monomer (EPDM), butyl and natural rubber compounds.

== Characteristics ==
MRP is a free flowing, black rubber powder that disperses into a multitude of systems and applications. Due to its micron size, MRP can be incorporated into multiple polymers, and provides a smooth surface appearance on finished products. In some cases, in order to improve compatibility with host materials, the MRP is given a chemical treatment to activate, or “make functional” the surface of the powder particles. This is referred to as functionalized MRP or FMRP.

MRP represents an evolution over previous post-manufactured rubber technologies. The most basic rubber processing technology converts end-of-life tire and post-industrial rubber material into rubber chips that are typically one inch or larger in size. These chips are then used in tire-derived fuel and civil engineering projects. A second-generation processing technology converts end-of-life tire and rubber material into crumb rubber, also known as ground tire rubber (GTR). GTR typically comprises chips between one inch and 30 mesh in size, with the associated fiber and steel mostly removed. This material is used in asphalt, as garden mulch and in playgrounds.

MRP is a micron-size material that is produced in various sizes, including 80 mesh and down to 300 mesh. MRP is virtually metal and fiber-free, enabling its use in a wide range of advanced products.

== Applications ==
MRP is used as a compound extender to offset the use of natural rubber and synthetic polymers as well as act as a process aid in material production. In some cases, MRP can reduce formulation costs, because it replaces commodity-priced rubber- and oil-based feedstocks. According to some estimates, MRP offers up to 50 percent cost savings over virgin raw materials.

MRP also can improve the sustainability, and in some cases the performance, of the compounds in which it is used. For example, the smaller particle sizes of MRP are known to increase the impact strength of certain plastic compositions. However, in all applications the particle size and loading levels depend on the target application.

Due to its size and composition, MRP can be incorporated into more advanced and higher-value applications than crumb rubber. Industries incorporating MRP into their products include tire, automotive, construction, industrial components and consumer products. It is also used as an additive in tires, plastics, asphalt, coatings, and sealants. MRP can also be incorporated into prime or recycled grade polypropylene (PP), high-density polyethylene (HDPE) and nylons. Additionally, the incorporation of MRPs in thermoplastic elastomers (TPE) and thermoplastic vulcanizates (TPV) makes it a feasible ingredient for automotive and building and construction applications.

Currently, the leading producer of MRP is Lehigh Technologies, which utilizes a cryogenic turbo mill process with more than 100 million pounds of annual production capacity. MRP produced by Lehigh has set high benchmarks for performance in a range of applications with customers and third-party research institutions, including several studies on increased asphalt performance. Lehigh claims more than 250 million tires on the road today have been made using its MRP.

There is an applicable American Society for Testing and Materials (ASTM) specification [ASTM D5603-01 (2008)] for the classification of rubber powder, including MRP.

== Safety ==
Numerous U.S. and European studies have found crumb rubber and MRP meet standards for human health and safety. Recently, an EPA study found that crumb rubber in field turfs and playgrounds contained concentrations of materials below harmful levels.
