= Translation (geometry) =

Planar movement within a Euclidean space without rotation

A translation moves every point of a figure or a space by the same amount in a given direction.

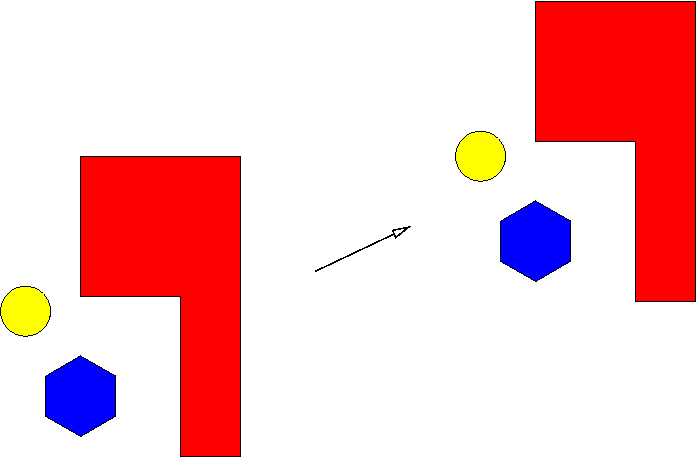
Translation of three objects

In Euclidean geometry, a translation is a geometric transformation that moves every point of a figure, shape or space by the same distance in a given direction. A translation can also be interpreted as the addition of a constant vector to every point, or as shifting the origin of the coordinate system. In a Euclidean space, any translation is an isometry.

A translation is an isometry that displaces the original figure according to a direction, a sense, and a length (vector). Translations preserve the direction and length of line segments, and the amplitudes of angles.

A slide is a translation along a screw axis, around which a rotation may also occur.

Practical examples of translation include elevators, escalators, conveyor belts and playground slides.

In translational symmetry, the figure "slides" along a line, remaining unchanged. In all translations, it is observed that the same element moves in a certain direction and always parallel to itself, that is, without ever rotating. In a frieze, there is a motif that repeats periodically, in a certain direction and always parallel to itself.

"Let AB be an oriented segment, in the plane π or in the space E. (Oriented means that the order in which the endpoints are cited is relevant: first A, and then B.) The translation determined by AB is the transformation (bijective correspondence) τ : π → π, or τ : E → E, defined by τ(X) = X', such that (AB, XX') and (AX, BX') are pairs of opposite sides of a parallelogram".

== As a function ==
If $\mathbf{v}$ is a fixed vector, known as the translation vector, and $\mathbf{p}$ is the initial position of some object, then the translation function $T_{\mathbf{v}}$ will work as $T_{\mathbf{v}}(\mathbf{p})=\mathbf{p}+\mathbf{v}$.

If $T$ is a translation, then the image of a subset $A$ under the function $T$ is the translate of $A$ by $T$. The translate of $A$ by $T_{\mathbf{v}}$ is often written as $A+\mathbf{v}$.

=== Application in classical physics ===
In classical physics, translational motion is movement that changes the position of an object, as opposed to rotation. For example, according to Whittaker:

If a body is moved from one position to another, and if the lines joining the initial and final points of each of the points of the body are a set of parallel straight lines of length ℓ, so that the orientation of the body in space is unaltered, the displacement is called a translation parallel to the direction of the lines, through a distance ℓ.

— E. T. Whittaker, A Treatise on the Analytical Dynamics of Particles and Rigid Bodies, p. 1

A translation is the operation changing the positions of all points $(x, y, z)$ of an object according to the formula

$$(x,y,z) \to (x+\Delta x,y+\Delta y, z+\Delta z)$$

where $(\Delta x,\ \Delta y,\ \Delta z)$ is the same vector for each point of the object. The translation vector $(\Delta x,\ \Delta y,\ \Delta z)$ common to all points of the object describes a particular type of displacement of the object, usually called a linear displacement to distinguish it from displacements involving rotation, called angular displacements.

When considering spacetime, a change of time coordinate is considered to be a translation.

== As an operator ==
The translation operator turns a function of the original position, $f(\mathbf{v})$, into a function of the final position, $f(\mathbf{v}+\mathbf{\delta})$. In other words, $T_\mathbf{\delta}$ is defined such that $T_\mathbf{\delta} f(\mathbf{v}) = f(\mathbf{v}+\mathbf{\delta}).$ This operator is more abstract than a function, since $T_\mathbf{\delta}$ defines a relationship between two functions, rather than the underlying vectors themselves. The translation operator can act on many kinds of functions, such as when the translation operator acts on a wavefunction, which is studied in the field of quantum mechanics.

== As a group ==
The set of all translations forms the translation group $\mathbb{T}$, which is isomorphic to the space itself, and a normal subgroup of Euclidean group $E(n)$. The quotient group of $E(n)$ by $\mathbb{T}$ is isomorphic to the group of rigid motions which fix a particular origin point, the orthogonal group $O(n)$:

$$E(n)/\mathbb{T}\cong O(n)$$

Because translation is commutative, the translation group is abelian. There are an infinite number of possible translations, so the translation group is an infinite group.

In the theory of relativity, due to the treatment of space and time as a single spacetime, translations can also refer to changes in the time coordinate. For example, the Galilean group and the Poincaré group include translations with respect to time.

=== Lattice groups ===
One kind of subgroup of the three-dimensional translation group are the lattice groups, which are infinite groups, but unlike the translation groups, are finitely generated. That is, a finite generating set generates the entire group.

== Matrix representation ==
A translation is an affine transformation with no fixed points. Matrix multiplications always have the origin as a fixed point. Nevertheless, there is a common workaround using homogeneous coordinates to represent a translation of a vector space with matrix multiplication: Write the 3-dimensional vector $\mathbf{v}=(v_x, v_y, v_z)$ using 4 homogeneous coordinates as $\mathbf{v}=(v_x, v_y, v_z, 1)$.

To translate an object by a vector $\mathbf{v}$, each homogeneous vector $\mathbf{p}$ (written in homogeneous coordinates) can be multiplied by this translation matrix:

$$T_{\mathbf{v}} =
\begin{bmatrix}
1 & 0 & 0 & v_x \\
0 & 1 & 0 & v_y \\
0 & 0 & 1 & v_z \\
0 & 0 & 0 & 1
\end{bmatrix}$$

As shown below, the multiplication will give the expected result:

$$T_{\mathbf{v}} \mathbf{p} =
\begin{bmatrix}
1 & 0 & 0 & v_x \\
0 & 1 & 0 & v_y\\
0 & 0 & 1 & v_z\\
0 & 0 & 0 & 1
\end{bmatrix}
\begin{bmatrix}
p_x \\ p_y \\ p_z \\ 1
\end{bmatrix}
=
\begin{bmatrix}
p_x + v_x \\ p_y + v_y \\ p_z + v_z \\ 1
\end{bmatrix}
= \mathbf{p} + \mathbf{v}$$

The inverse of a translation matrix can be obtained by reversing the direction of the vector (in other words, it is an M-matrix):

$$T^{-1}_{\mathbf{v}} = T_{-\mathbf{v}} . \!$$

Similarly, the product of translation matrices is given by adding the vectors:

$$T_{\mathbf{v}}T_{\mathbf{w}} = T_{\mathbf{v}+\mathbf{w}} . \!$$

Because addition of vectors is commutative, multiplication of translation matrices is therefore also commutative (unlike multiplication of arbitrary matrices).

== Translation of axes ==
While geometric translation is often viewed as an active transformation that changes the position of a geometric object, a similar result can be achieved by a passive transformation that moves the coordinate system itself but leaves the object fixed. The passive version of an active geometric translation is known as a translation of axes.

== Translational symmetry ==
An object that looks the same before and after translation is said to have translational symmetry. A common example is a periodic function, which is an eigenfunction of a translation operator.

In translational symmetry, the figure "slides" along a line, remaining unchanged. In all translations, it is observed that the same element moves in a certain direction and always parallel to itself, that is, without ever rotating. In a frieze, there is a motif that repeats periodically, in a certain direction and always parallel to itself.

== Translations of a graph ==
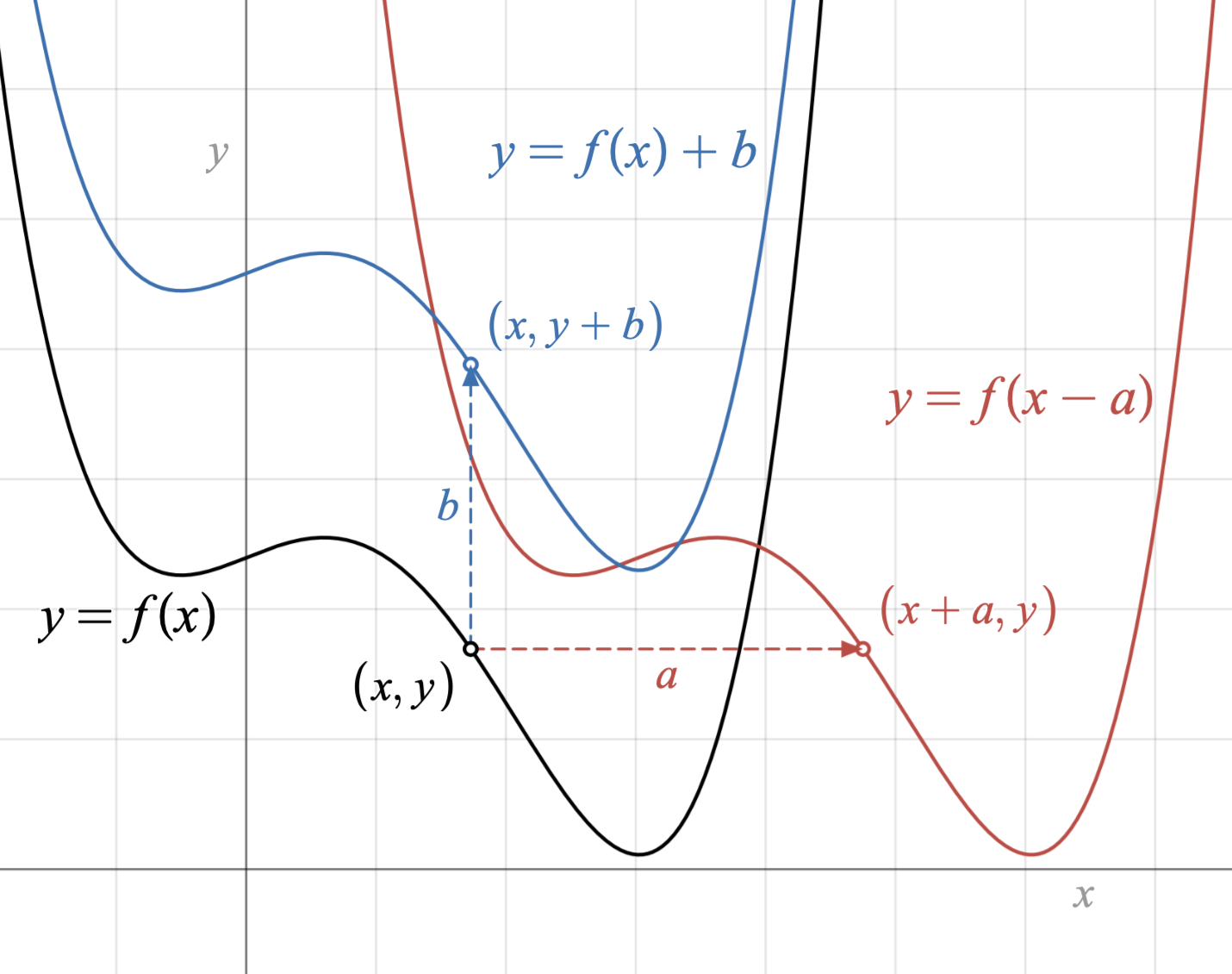
Compared to the graph y = f(x), the graph y = f(x − a) has been translated horizontally by a, while the graph y = f(x) + b has been translated vertically by b.

The graph of a real function f, the set of points $(x, f(x))$, is often pictured in the real coordinate plane with x as the horizontal coordinate and $y = f(x)$ as the vertical coordinate.

Starting from the graph of f, a horizontal translation means composing f with a function $x \mapsto x - a$, for some constant number a, resulting in a graph consisting of points $(x, f(x - a))$. Each point $(x, y)$ of the original graph corresponds to the point $(x + a, y)$ in the new graph, which pictorially results in a horizontal shift.

A vertical translation means composing the function $y \mapsto y + b$ with f, for some constant b, resulting in a graph consisting of the points $\bigl(x, f(x) + b\bigr)$. Each point $(x, y)$ of the original graph corresponds to the point $(x, y + b)$ in the new graph, which pictorially results in a vertical shift.

For example, taking the quadratic function $y = x^2$, whose graph is a parabola with vertex at $(0, 0)$, a horizontal translation 5 units to the right would be the new function $y = (x - 5)^2 = x^2 - 10x + 25$ whose vertex has coordinates $(5, 0)$. A vertical translation 3 units upward would be the new function $y = x^2 + 3$ whose vertex has coordinates $(0, 3)$.

The antiderivatives of a function all differ from each other by a constant of integration and are therefore vertical translates of each other.

== Applications ==
For describing vehicle dynamics (or movement of any rigid body), including ship dynamics and aircraft dynamics, it is common to use a mechanical model consisting of six degrees of freedom, which includes translations along three reference axes (as well as rotations about those three axes). These translations are often called surge, sway, and heave.

== See also ==
- 2D computer graphics#Translation
- Advection
- Change of basis
- Parallel transport
- Rotation matrix
- Scaling (geometry)
- Transformation matrix
- Translational symmetry
