= Active and passive transformation =

Distinction between meanings of Euclidean space transformations

In the passive transformation (left), point P stays fixed, while the coordinate system rotates counterclockwise by an angle θ about its origin. In the active transformation (right), a point P is transformed to point P′ by rotating clockwise by angle θ about the origin of a fixed coordinate system. The coordinates of P′ after the active transformation relative to the original coordinate system are the same as the coordinates of P relative to the rotated coordinate system.

Geometric transformations can be distinguished into two types: active or alibi transformations which change the physical position of a set of points relative to a fixed frame of reference or coordinate system (alibi meaning "being somewhere else at the same time"); and passive or alias transformations which leave points fixed but change the frame of reference or coordinate system relative to which they are described (alias meaning "going under a different name").

For instance, active transformations are useful to describe successive positions of a rigid body. On the other hand, passive transformations may be useful in human motion analysis to observe the motion of the tibia relative to the femur, that is, its motion relative to a (local) coordinate system which moves together with the femur, rather than a (global) coordinate system which is fixed to the floor.

In three-dimensional Euclidean space, any proper rigid transformation, whether active or passive, can be represented as a screw displacement, the composition of a translation along an axis and a rotation about that axis.

The terms active transformation and passive transformation were first introduced in 1957 by Valentine Bargmann for describing Lorentz transformations in special relativity.

== Example ==
Rotation considered as an active (alibi) or passive (alias) transformation

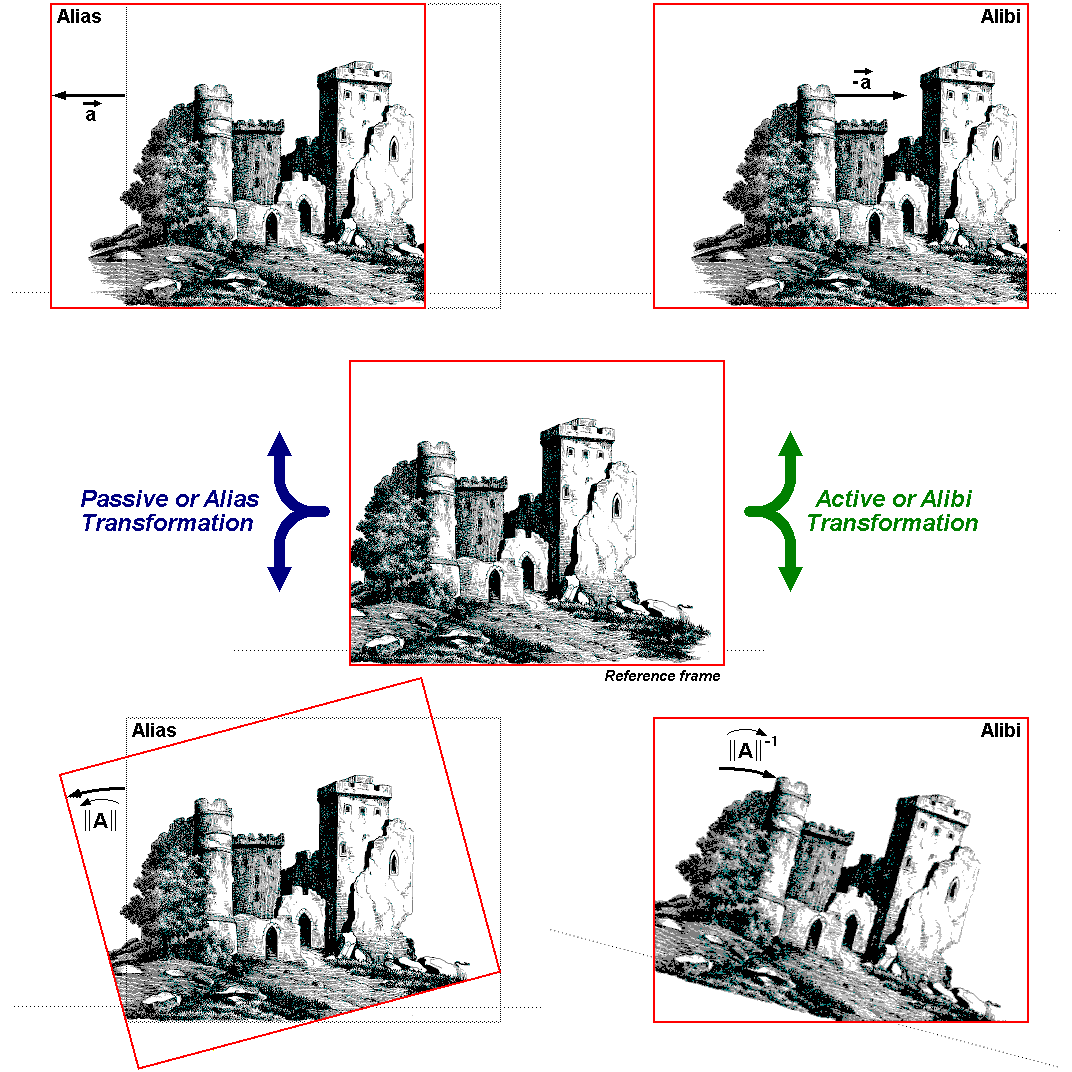
Translation and rotation as passive (alias) or active (alibi) transformations

As an example, let the vector $\mathbf{v}=(v_1,v_2) \in \R^2$, be a vector in the plane. A rotation of the vector through an angle θ in counterclockwise direction is given by the rotation matrix:
$$R=
\begin{pmatrix}
\cos \theta & -\sin \theta\\
\sin \theta &  \cos \theta
\end{pmatrix},$$
which can be viewed either as an active transformation or a passive transformation (where the above matrix will be inverted), as described below.

== Spatial transformations in the Euclidean space R^{3} ==
In general a spatial transformation $T\colon\R^3\to \R^3$ may consist of a translation and a linear transformation. In the following, the translation will be omitted, and the linear transformation will be represented by a 3×3 matrix $T$.

=== Active transformation ===
As an active transformation, $T$ transforms the initial vector $\mathbf{v}=(v_x,v_y,v_z)$ into a new vector $\mathbf{v}'=(v'_x,v'_y,v'_z)=T\mathbf{v}=T(v_x,v_y,v_z)$.

If one views $\{\mathbf{e}'_x=T(1,0,0),\ \mathbf{e}'_y=T(0,1,0),\ \mathbf{e}'_z=T(0,0,1)\}$ as a new basis, then the coordinates of the new vector $\mathbf{v}'=v_x\mathbf{e}'_x+v_y\mathbf{e}'_y+v_z\mathbf{e}'_z$ in the new basis are the same as those of $\mathbf{v}=v_x\mathbf{e}_x+v_y\mathbf{e}_y+v_z\mathbf{e}_z$ in the original basis. Note that active transformations make sense even as a linear transformation into a different vector space. It makes sense to write the new vector in the unprimed basis (as above) only when the transformation is from the space into itself.

=== Passive transformation ===
On the other hand, when one views $T$ as a passive transformation, the initial vector $\mathbf{v}=(v_x,v_y,v_z)$ is left unchanged, while the coordinate system and its basis vectors are transformed in the opposite direction, that is, with the inverse transformation $T^{-1}$. This gives a new coordinate system XYZ with basis vectors:
$$\mathbf{e}_X = T^{-1}(1,0,0),\ \mathbf{e}_Y = T^{-1}(0,1,0),\ \mathbf{e}_Z = T^{-1}(0,0,1)$$

The new coordinates $(v_X,v_Y,v_Z)$ of $\mathbf{v}$ with respect to the new coordinate system XYZ are given by:
$$\mathbf{v} = (v_x,v_y,v_z) = v_X\mathbf{e}_X+v_Y\mathbf{e}_Y+v_Z\mathbf{e}_Z = T^{-1}(v_X,v_Y,v_Z).$$

From this equation one sees that the new coordinates are given by
$$(v_X,v_Y,v_Z) = T(v_x,v_y,v_z).$$

As a passive transformation $T$ transforms the old coordinates into the new ones.

Note the equivalence between the two kinds of transformations: the coordinates of the new point in the active transformation and the new coordinates of the point in the passive transformation are the same, namely
$$(v_X,v_Y,v_Z)=(v'_x,v'_y,v'_z).$$

== In abstract vector spaces ==
The distinction between active and passive transformations can be seen mathematically by considering abstract vector spaces.

Fix a finite-dimensional vector space $V$ over a field $K$ (thought of as $\mathbb{R}$ or $\mathbb{C}$), and a basis $\mathcal{B} = \{e_i\}_{1 \leq i \leq n}$ of $V$. This basis provides an isomorphism $C: K^n \rightarrow V$ via the component map $(v_i)_{1 \leq i \leq n} = (v_1, \cdots, v_n) \mapsto \sum_i v_i e_i$.

An active transformation is then an endomorphism on $V$, that is, a linear map from $V$ to itself. Taking such a transformation $\tau \in \text{End}(V)$, a vector $v \in V$ transforms as $v \mapsto \tau v$. The components of $\tau$ with respect to the basis $\mathcal{B}$ are defined via the equation $\tau e_i = \sum_j\tau_{ji}e_j$. Then, the components of $v$ transform as $v_i \mapsto \tau_{ij}v_j$.

A passive transformation is instead an endomorphism on $K^n$. This is applied to the components: $v_i \mapsto T_{ij}v_j =: v'_i$. Provided that $T$ is invertible, the new basis $\mathcal{B}' = \{e'_i\}$ is determined by asking that $v_ie_i = v'_i e'_i$, from which the expression $e'_i = (T^{-1})_{ji}e_j$ can be derived.

Although the spaces $\text{End}(V)$ and $\text{End}({K^n})$ are isomorphic, they are not canonically isomorphic. Nevertheless a choice of basis $\mathcal{B}$ allows construction of an isomorphism.

=== As left- and right-actions ===
Often one restricts to the case where the maps are invertible, so that active transformations are the general linear group $\text{GL}(V)$ of transformations while passive transformations are the group $\text{GL}(n, K)$.

The transformations can then be understood as acting on the space of bases for $V$. An active transformation $\tau \in \text{GL}(V)$ sends the basis $\{e_i\} \mapsto \{\tau e_i\}$. Meanwhile a passive transformation $T \in \text{GL}(n, K)$ sends the basis $\{e_i\} \mapsto \left\{\sum_{j}(T^{-1})_{ji}e_j\right\}$.

The inverse in the passive transformation ensures the components transform identically under $\tau$ and $T$. This then gives a sharp distinction between active and passive transformations: active transformations act from the left on bases, while the passive transformations act from the right, due to the inverse.

This observation is made more natural by viewing bases $\mathcal{B}$ as a choice of isomorphism $\Phi_{\mathcal{B}}: K^n \rightarrow V$. The space of bases is equivalently the space of such isomorphisms, denoted $\text{Iso}(K^n, V)$. Active transformations, identified with $\text{GL}(V)$, act on $\text{Iso}(K^n, V)$ from the left by composition, that is if $\tau$ represents an active transformation, we have $\Phi_{\mathcal{B'}} = \tau \circ \Phi_{\mathcal{B}}$. On the opposite, passive transformations, identified with $\text{GL}(n, K)$ acts on $\text{Iso}(K^n, V)$ from the right by pre-composition, that is if $T$ represents a passive transformation, we have $\Phi_{\mathcal{B''}} = \Phi_{\mathcal{B}} \circ T$.

This turns the space of bases into a left $\text{GL}(V)$-torsor and a right $\text{GL}(n, K)$-torsor.

From a physical perspective, active transformations can be characterized as transformations of physical space, while passive transformations are characterized as redundancies in the description of physical space. This plays an important role in mathematical gauge theory, where gauge transformations are described mathematically by transition maps which act from the right on fibers.

== See also ==
- Change of basis
- Covariance and contravariance of vectors
- Rotation of axes
- Translation of axes
