= Dha (Indic) =

Letter "Dha" in Indic scripts

Example glyphs
- Bengali–Assamese: Dha
- Tibetan: དྷ
- Thai: ธ
- Malayalam: ധ
- Sinhala: ධ
- Ashoka Brahmi: Dha
- Devanagari: Dha

Cognates
- Hebrew: ד
- Greek: Δ
- Latin: D
- Cyrillic: Д

Properties
- Phonemic representation: /dʰ/ /tʰ/^{B}
- IAST transliteration: dh Dh
- ISCII code point: C5 (197)
- ^B in Tai languages, Mon and Khmer

Dha is a consonant of Indic abugidas. In modern Indic scripts, Dha is derived from the early "Ashoka" Brahmi letter after having gone through the Gupta letter.

== Āryabhaṭa numeration ==
Aryabhata used Devanagari letters for numbers, very similar to the Greek numerals, even after the invention of Indian numerals. The values of the different forms of ध are:

- ध [dʰə] = 19 (१९)
- धि [dʰɪ] = 1,900 (१ ९००)
- धु [dʰʊ] = 190,000 (१ ९० ०००)
- धृ [dʰri] = 19,000,000 (१ ९० ०० ०००)
- धॢ [dʰlə] = 19×10^{8} (१९×१०^{८})
- धे [dʰe] = 19×10^{10} (१९×१०^{१०})
- धै [dʰɛː] = 19×10^{12} (१९×१०^{१२})
- धो [dʰoː] = 19×10^{14} (१९×१०^{१४})
- धौ [dʰɔː] = 19×10^{16} (१९×१०^{१६})

== Historic Dha ==
There are three different general early historic scripts - Brahmi and its variants, Kharoṣṭhī, and Tocharian, the so-called slanting Brahmi. Dha as found in standard Brahmi, was a simple geometric shape, with variations toward more flowing forms by the Gupta. The Tocharian Dha did not have an alternate Fremdzeichen form. The third form of dha, in Kharoshthi was probably derived from Aramaic separately from the Brahmi letter.

=== Brahmi Dha ===
The Brahmi letter, Dha, is probably derived from the Aramaic Dalet, and is thus related to the modern Latin D and Greek Delta. Several identifiable styles of writing the Brahmi Dha can be found, most associated with a specific set of inscriptions from an artifact or diverse records from an historic period. As the earliest and most geometric style of Brahmi, the letters found on the Edicts of Ashoka and other records from around that time are normally the reference form for Brahmi letters, with vowel marks not attested until later forms of Brahmi back-formed to match the geometric writing style.

Brahmi Dha historic forms
Ashoka (3rd-1st c. BCE)	Girnar (~150 BCE)	Kushana (~150-250 CE)	Gujarat (~250 CE)	Gupta (~350 CE)

=== Tocharian Dha ===
The Tocharian letter is derived from the Brahmi, but does not have an alternate Fremdzeichen form.

Tocharian Dha with vowel marks
Dha	Dhā	Dhi	Dhī	Dhu	Dhū	Dhr	Dhr̄	Dhe	Dhai	Dho	Dhau	Dhä

=== Kharoṣṭhī Dha ===
The Kharoṣṭhī letter is generally accepted as being derived from the Aramaic Dalet, and is thus related to D and Delta, in addition to the Brahmi Dha.

== Devanagari Dha ==
Dha (ध) is a consonant of the Devanagari abugida. It ultimately arose from the Brahmi letter, after having gone through the Gupta letter. Letters that derive from it are the Gujarati letter ધ, and the Modi letter 𑘠.

=== Devanagari-using Languages ===
In all languages, ध is pronounced as [dʱə] or [dʱ] when appropriate. Like all Indic scripts, Devanagari uses vowel marks attached to the base consonant to override the inherent /ə/ vowel:

Devanagari ध with vowel marks
Dha	Dhā	Dhi	Dhī	Dhu	Dhū	Dhr	Dhr̄	Dhl	Dhl̄	Dhe	Dhai	Dho	Dhau	Dh
ध	धा	धि	धी	धु	धू	धृ	धॄ	धॢ	धॣ	धे	धै	धो	धौ	ध्

=== Conjuncts with ध ===
Devanagari exhibits conjunct ligatures, as is common in Indic scripts. In modern Devanagari texts, most conjuncts are formed by reducing the letter shape to fit tightly to the following letter, usually by dropping a character's vertical stem, sometimes referred to as a "half form". Some conjunct clusters are always represented by a true ligature, instead of a shape that can be broken into constituent independent letters. Vertically stacked conjuncts are ubiquitous in older texts, while only a few are still used routinely in modern Devanagari texts. Dha however, does not have a vertical stem to drop for making a half form, and either forms a stacked conjunct/ligature, or uses its full form with Virama. The use of ligatures and vertical conjuncts may vary across languages using the Devanagari script, with Marathi in particular preferring the use of half forms where texts in other languages would show ligatures and vertical stacks.

==== Ligature conjuncts of ध ====
True ligatures are quite rare in Indic scripts. The most common ligated conjuncts in Devanagari are in the form of a slight mutation to fit in context or as a consistent variant form appended to the adjacent characters. Those variants include Na and the Repha and Rakar forms of Ra. Nepali and Marathi texts use the "eyelash" Ra half form for an initial "R" instead of repha.

- Repha र্ (r) + ध (dʱa) gives the ligature rdʱa: ^{note}

- Eyelash र্ (r) + ध (dʱa) gives the ligature rdʱa:

- ध্ (dʱ) + rakar र (ra) gives the ligature dʱra:

- Repha र্ (r) + ध্ (dʱ) + rakar र (ra) gives the ligature rdʱra:

- छ্ (cʰ) + ध (dʱa) gives the ligature cʰdʱa:

- ध্ (dʱ) + न (na) gives the ligature dʱna:

- द্ (d) + ध (dʱa) gives the ligature ddʱa:

- न্ (n) + द্ (d) + ध (dʱa) gives the ligature nddʱa:

- Repha र্ (r) + द্ (d) + ध (dʱa) gives the ligature rddʱa:

- द্ (d) + ध্ (dʱ) + म (ma) gives the ligature ddʱma:

- द্ (d) + ध্ (dʱ) + व (va) gives the ligature ddʱva:

==== Stacked conjuncts of ध ====
Vertically stacked ligatures are the most common conjunct forms found in Devanagari text. Although the constituent characters may need to be stretched and moved slightly in order to stack neatly, stacked conjuncts can be broken down into recognizable base letters, or a letter and an otherwise standard ligature.

- ड্ (ḍ) + ध (dʱa) gives the ligature ḍdʱa:

- ढ্ (ḍʱ) + ध (dʱa) gives the ligature ḍʱdʱa:

- ध্ (dʱ) + च (ca) gives the ligature dʱca:

- ध্ (dʱ) + ड (ḍa) gives the ligature dʱḍa:

- ध্ (dʱ) + ज (ja) gives the ligature dʱja:

- ध্ (dʱ) + ज্ (j) + ञ (ña) gives the ligature dʱjña:

- ध্ (dʱ) + ल (la) gives the ligature dʱla:

- ध্ (dʱ) + ङ (ŋa) gives the ligature dʱŋa:

- ध্ (dʱ) + ञ (ña) gives the ligature dʱña:

- ङ্ (ŋ) + ध (dʱa) gives the ligature ŋdʱa:

- ट্ (ṭ) + ध (dʱa) gives the ligature ṭdʱa:

- ठ্ (ṭʰ) + ध (dʱa) gives the ligature ṭʰdʱa:

== Bengali Dha ==
The Bengali script ধ is derived from the Siddhaṃ, and is marked by the same lack of a horizontal head line, but less geometric shape, than its Devanagari counterpart, ध. The inherent vowel of Bengali consonant letters is /ɔ/, so the bare letter ধ will sometimes be transliterated as "dho" instead of "dha". Adding okar, the "o" vowel mark, gives a reading of /d̪ʱo/. Like all Indic consonants, ধ can be modified by marks to indicate another (or no) vowel than its inherent "a".

Bengali ধ with vowel marks
dha	dhā	dhi	dhī	dhu	dhū	dhr	dhr̄	dhe	dhai	dho	dhau	dh
ধ	ধা	ধি	ধী	ধু	ধূ	ধৃ	ধৄ	ধে	ধৈ	ধো	ধৌ	ধ্

=== ধ in Bengali-using languages ===
ধ is used as a basic consonant character in all of the major Bengali script orthographies, including Bengali and Assamese.

=== Conjuncts with ধ ===
Bengali ধ exhibits conjunct ligatures, as is common in Indic scripts, with a tendency towards linear (horizontal) ligatures, and few stacked ligatures.

- দ্ (d) + ধ (dʱa) gives the ligature ddʱa:

- ধ্ (dʱ) + ম (ma) gives the ligature dʱma:

- ধ্ (dʱ) + ন (na) gives the ligature dʱna:

- ধ্ (dʱ) + র (ra) gives the ligature dʱra, with the ra phala suffix:

- ধ্ (dʱ) + ব (va) gives the ligature dʱva, with the va phala suffix:

- ধ্ (dʱ) + য (ya) gives the ligature dʱya, with the ya phala suffix:

- গ্ (g) + ধ (dʱa) gives the ligature gdʱa:

- গ্ (g) + ধ্ (dʱ) + র (ra) gives the ligature gdʱra, with the ra phala suffix:

- গ্ (g) + ধ্ (dʱ) + য (ya) gives the ligature gdʱya, with the ya phala suffix:

- ন্ (n) + ধ (dʱa) gives the ligature ndʱa:

- ন্ (n) + ধ্ (dʱ) + র (ra) gives the ligature ndʱra, with the ra phala suffix:

- ন্ (n) + ধ্ (dʱ) + য (ya) gives the ligature ndʱya, with the ya phala suffix:

- র্ (r) + ধ (dʱa) gives the ligature rdʱa, with the repha prefix:

- র্ (r) + ধ্ (dʱ) + ব (va) gives the ligature rdʱva, with the repha prefix and va phala suffix:

== Gujarati Dha ==
Gujarati Dha.

Dha (ધ) is the nineteenth consonant of the Gujarati abugida. It is derived from the Devanagari Dha, and ultimately the Brahmi letter. ધ (Dha) is similar in appearance to ઘ (Gha), and care should be taken to avoid confusing the two when reading Gujarati script texts.

=== Gujarati-using Languages ===
The Gujarati script is used to write the Gujarati and Kutchi languages. In both languages, ધ is pronounced as [dʱə] or [dʱ] when appropriate. Like all Indic scripts, Gujarati uses vowel marks attached to the base consonant to override the inherent /ə/ vowel:

Dha	Dhā	Dhi	Dhī	Dhu	Dhū	Dhr	Dhl	Dhr̄	Dhl̄	Dhĕ	Dhe	Dhai	Dhŏ	Dho	Dhau	Dh
Gujarati Dha syllables, with vowel marks in red.

=== Conjuncts with ધ ===
Half form of Dha.

Gujarati ધ exhibits conjunct ligatures, much like its parent Devanagari Script. Most Gujarati conjuncts can only be formed by reducing the letter shape to fit tightly to the following letter, usually by dropping a character's vertical stem, sometimes referred to as a "half form". A few conjunct clusters can be represented by a true ligature, instead of a shape that can be broken into constituent independent letters, and vertically stacked conjuncts can also be found in Gujarati, although much less commonly than in Devanagari. True ligatures are quite rare in Indic scripts. The most common ligated conjuncts in Gujarati are in the form of a slight mutation to fit in context or as a consistent variant form appended to the adjacent characters. Those variants include Na and the Repha and Rakar forms of Ra.

- ર્ (r) + ધ (dʱa) gives the ligature RDha:

- ધ્ (dʱ) + ર (ra) gives the ligature DhRa:

- દ્ (d) + ધ (dʱa) gives the ligature DDha:

- ધ્ (dʱ) + ન (na) gives the ligature DhNa:

== Telugu Dha ==
Telugu independent and subjoined Dha.

Dha (ధ) is a consonant of the Telugu abugida. It ultimately arose from the Brahmi letter. It is closely related to the Kannada letter ಧ. Most Telugu consonants contain a v-shaped headstroke that is related to the horizontal headline found in other Indic scripts, although headstrokes do not connect adjacent letters in Telugu. The headstroke is normally lost when adding vowel matras. Telugu conjuncts are created by reducing trailing letters to a subjoined form that appears below the initial consonant of the conjunct. Many subjoined forms are created by dropping their headline, with many extending the end of the stroke of the main letter body to form an extended tail reaching up to the right of the preceding consonant. This subjoining of trailing letters to create conjuncts is in contrast to the leading half forms of Devanagari and Bengali letters. Ligature conjuncts are not a feature in Telugu, with the only non-standard construction being an alternate subjoined form of Ṣa (borrowed from Kannada) in the KṢa conjunct.

== Malayalam Dha ==
Malayalam letter Dha

Dha (ധ) is a consonant of the Malayalam abugida. It ultimately arose from the Brahmi letter, via the Grantha letter Dha. Like in other Indic scripts, Malayalam consonants have the inherent vowel "a", and take one of several modifying vowel signs to represent syllables with another vowel or no vowel at all.

Malayalam Dha matras: Dha, Dhā, Dhi, Dhī, Dhu, Dhū, Dhr̥, Dhr̥̄, Dhl̥, Dhl̥̄, Dhe, Dhē, Dhai, Dho, Dhō, Dhau, and Dh.

=== Conjuncts of ധ ===
As is common in Indic scripts, Malayalam joins letters together to form conjunct consonant clusters. There are several ways in which conjuncts are formed in Malayalam texts: using a post-base form of a trailing consonant placed under the initial consonant of a conjunct, a combined ligature of two or more consonants joined together, a conjoining form that appears as a combining mark on the rest of the conjunct, the use of an explicit candrakkala mark to suppress the inherent "a" vowel, or a special consonant form called a "chillu" letter, representing a bare consonant without the inherent "a" vowel. Texts written with the modern reformed Malayalam orthography, put̪iya lipi, may favor more regular conjunct forms than older texts in paḻaya lipi, due to changes undertaken in the 1970s by the Government of Kerala.

- ദ് (d) + ധ (dʱa) gives the ligature ddʱa:

- ന് (n) + ധ (dʱa) gives the ligature ndʱa:

== Odia Dha ==
Odia independent and subjoined letter Dha.

Dha (ଧ) is a consonant of the Odia abugida. It ultimately arose from the Brahmi letter, via the Siddhaṃ letter Dha. Like in other Indic scripts, Odia consonants have the inherent vowel "a", and take one of several modifying vowel signs to represent syllables with another vowel or no vowel at all. Like other Oriya letters with an open top, ଧ takes the subjoined matra form of the vowel i (ଇ):

Odia Dha with vowel matras
Dha	Dhā	Dhi	Dhī	Dhu	Dhū	Dhr̥	Dhr̥̄	Dhl̥	Dhl̥̄	Dhe	Dhai	Dho	Dhau	Dh
ଧ	ଧା	ଧି	ଧୀ	ଧୁ	ଧୂ	ଧୃ	ଧୄ	ଧୢ	ଧୣ	ଧେ	ଧୈ	ଧୋ	ଧୌ	ଧ୍

=== Conjuncts of ଧ ===
As is common in Indic scripts, Odia joins letters together to form conjunct consonant clusters. The most common conjunct formation is achieved by using a small subjoined form of trailing consonants. Most consonants' subjoined forms are identical to the full form, just reduced in size, although a few drop the curved headline or have a subjoined form not directly related to the full form of the consonant. The second type of conjunct formation is through pure ligatures, where the constituent consonants are written together in a single graphic form. This ligature may be recognizable as being a combination of two characters or it can have a conjunct ligature unrelated to its constituent characters.

- ଦ୍ (d) + ଧ (dʱa) gives the ligature ddʱa:

- ନ୍ (n) + ଧ (dʱa) gives the ligature ndʱa:

- ଧ୍ (dʱ) + ୟ (ya) gives the ligature dʱya:

== Kaithi Dha ==
Kaithi consonant and half-form Dha.

Dha (𑂡) is a consonant of the Kaithi abugida. It ultimately arose from the Brahmi letter, via the Siddhaṃ letter Dha. Like in other Indic scripts, Kaithi consonants have the inherent vowel "a", and take one of several modifying vowel signs to represent syllables with another vowel or no vowel at all.

Kaithi Dha with vowel matras
Dha	Dhā	Dhi	Dhī	Dhu	Dhū	Dhe	Dhai	Dho	Dhau	Dh
𑂡	𑂡𑂰	𑂡𑂱	𑂡𑂲	𑂡𑂳	𑂡𑂴	𑂡𑂵	𑂡𑂶	𑂡𑂷	𑂡𑂸	𑂡𑂹

=== Conjuncts of 𑂡 ===
As is common in Indic scripts, Odia joins letters together to form conjunct consonant clusters. The most common conjunct formation is achieved by using a half form of preceding consonants, although several consonants use an explicit virama. Most half forms are derived from the full form by removing the vertical stem. As is common in most Indic scripts, conjuncts of ra are indicated with a repha or rakar mark attached to the rest of the consonant cluster. In addition, there are a few vertical conjuncts that can be found in Kaithi writing, but true ligatures are not used in the modern Kaithi script.

- 𑂡୍ (dʱ) + 𑂩 (ra) gives the ligature dʱra:

- 𑂩୍ (r) + 𑂡 (dʱa) gives the ligature rdʱa:

== Tirhuta Dha ==
Tirhuta consonant Dha

Dha (𑒡) is a consonant of the Tirhuta abugida. It ultimately arose from the Brahmi letter, via the Siddhaṃ letter Dha. Like in other Indic scripts, Tirhuta consonants have the inherent vowel "a", and take one of several modifying vowel signs to represent sylables with another vowel or no vowel at all.

Tirhuta Dha with vowel matras
Dha	Dhā	Dhi	Dhī	Dhu	Dhū	Dhṛ	Dhṝ	Dhḷ	Dhḹ	Dhē	Dhe	Dhai	Dhō	Dho	Dhau	Dh
𑒡	𑒡𑒰	𑒡𑒱	𑒡𑒲	𑒡𑒳	𑒡𑒴	𑒡𑒵	𑒡𑒶	𑒡𑒷	𑒡𑒸	𑒡𑒹	𑒡𑒺	𑒡𑒻	𑒡𑒼	𑒡𑒽	𑒡𑒾	𑒡𑓂

=== Conjuncts of 𑒡 ===
As is common in Indic scripts, Tirhuta joins letters together to form conjunct consonant clusters. The most common conjunct formation is achieved by using an explicit virama. As is common in most Indic scripts, conjuncts of ra are indicated with a repha or rakar mark attached to the rest of the consonant cluster. In addition, other consonants take unique combining forms when in conjunct with other letters, and there are several vertical conjuncts and true ligatures that can be found in Tirhuta writing.

- 𑒥୍ (b) + 𑒡 (dʱa) gives the ligature bdʱa:

- 𑒠୍ (d) + 𑒡 (dʱa) gives the ligature ddʱa:

- 𑒡୍ (dʱ) + 𑒩 (ra) gives the ligature dʱra:

- 𑒡 (dʱ) + 𑒅 (u) gives the ligature dʱu:

- 𑒡 (dʱ) + 𑒆 (ū) gives the ligature dʱū:

- 𑒡୍ (dʱ) + 𑒫 (va) gives the ligature dʱva:

- 𑒑୍ (g) + 𑒡 (dʱa) gives the ligature gdʱa:

- 𑒢୍ (n) + 𑒡 (dʱa) gives the ligature ndʱa:

- 𑒩୍ (r) + 𑒡 (dʱa) gives the ligature rdʱa:

- 𑒞୍ (t) + 𑒡 (dʱa) gives the ligature tdʱa:

== Comparison of Dha ==
The various Indic scripts are generally related to each other through adaptation and borrowing, and as such the glyphs for cognate letters, including Dha, are related as well.

Comparison of Dha in different scripts

Aramaic
Kharoṣṭhī 𐨢	Ashoka Brahmi	Kushana Brahmi (Note: The middle "Kushana" form of Brahmi is a later style that emerged as Brahmi scripts were beginning to proliferate. Gupta Brahmi was definitely a stylistic descendant from Kushana, but other Brahmi-derived scripts may have descended from earlier forms.)	Tocharian (Note: Tocharian is probably derived from the middle period "Kushana" form of Brahmi, although artifacts from that time are not plentiful enough to establish a definite succession.)
Gupta Brahmi	Pallava
Kadamba -
Bhaiksuki 𑰠	Siddhaṃ	Grantha 𑌧	Cham ꨖ
Sinhala ධ	Pyu / Old Mon (Note: Pyu and Old Mon are probably the precursors of the Burmese script, and may be derived from either the Pallava or Kadamba script) -
Tibetan དྷ	Newa 𑐢	Ahom 𑜔	Malayalam ധ
Telugu ధ	Burmese ဓ
Lepcha -	Ranjana	Saurashtra ꢤ	Dives Akuru 𑤞
Kannada ಧ	Kayah Li -
Limbu ᤎ	Soyombo (Note: May also be derived from Devangari (see bottom left of table)) 𑩮	Khmer ធ	Tamil -
Chakma 𑄙	Tai Tham ᨵ
Meitei Mayek ꯙ	Gaudi -	Thai ธ	Lao ຘ
Tai Le -
Marchen -	Tirhuta 𑒡	New Tai Lue ᦒ	Tai Viet -	Aksara Kawi
'Phags-pa -	Odia ଧ	Sharada 𑆣	Rejang -	Batak -	Buginese -
Zanabazar Square 𑨜	Bengali–Assamese	Takri 𑚜	Javanese ꦣ	Balinese ᬥ	Makasar -
Hangul (Note: The Origin of Hangul from 'Phags-pa is one of limited influence, inspiring at most a few basic letter shapes. Hangul does not function as an Indic abugida.) -	Northern Nagari -	Dogri 𑠜	Laṇḍā -	Sundanese -	Baybayin -
Modi 𑘠	Gujarati ધ	Khojki 𑈝	Khudabadi 𑋐	Mahajani 𑅦	Tagbanwa -
Devanagari	Nandinagari 𑧀	Kaithi	Gurmukhi ਧ	Multani 𑊙	Buhid -
Canadian Syllabics (Note: Although the basic letter forms of the Canadian Aboriginal Syllabics were derived from handwritten Devanagari letters, this abugida indicates vowel sounds by rotations of the letter form, rather than the use of vowel diacritics as is standard in Indic abugidas.) -	Soyombo (Note: May also be derived from Ranjana (see above)) 𑩮	Sylheti Nagari ꠗ	Gunjala Gondi 𑵹	Masaram Gondi (Note: Masaram Gondi acts as an Indic abugida, but its letterforms were not derived from any single precursor script.) 𑴞	Hanuno'o -

== Character encodings of Dha ==
Most Indic scripts are encoded in the Unicode Standard, and as such the letter Dha in those scripts can be represented in plain text with unique codepoint. Dha from several modern-use scripts can also be found in legacy encodings, such as ISCII.

Character information
Preview					ధ		ଧ		ಧ		ധ		ધ		ਧ	
Unicode name	DEVANAGARI LETTER DHA		BENGALI LETTER DHA		TELUGU LETTER DHA		ORIYA LETTER DHA		KANNADA LETTER DHA		MALAYALAM LETTER DHA		GUJARATI LETTER DHA		GURMUKHI LETTER DHA	
Encodings	decimal	hex	dec	hex	dec	hex	dec	hex	dec	hex	dec	hex	dec	hex	dec	hex
Unicode	2343	U+0927	2471	U+09A7	3111	U+0C27	2855	U+0B27	3239	U+0CA7	3367	U+0D27	2727	U+0AA7	2599	U+0A27
UTF-8	224 164 167	E0 A4 A7	224 166 167	E0 A6 A7	224 176 167	E0 B0 A7	224 172 167	E0 AC A7	224 178 167	E0 B2 A7	224 180 167	E0 B4 A7	224 170 167	E0 AA A7	224 168 167	E0 A8 A7
Numeric character reference	&#2343;	&#x927;	&#2471;	&#x9A7;	&#3111;	&#xC27;	&#2855;	&#xB27;	&#3239;	&#xCA7;	&#3367;	&#xD27;	&#2727;	&#xAA7;	&#2599;	&#xA27;
ISCII	197	C5	197	C5	197	C5	197	C5	197	C5	197	C5	197	C5	197	C5

Character information
Preview	Ashoka Kushana Gupta		𐨢				𑌧	
Unicode name	BRAHMI LETTER DHA		KHAROSHTHI LETTER DHA		SIDDHAM LETTER DHA		GRANTHA LETTER DHA	
Encodings	decimal	hex	dec	hex	dec	hex	dec	hex
Unicode	69669	U+11025	68130	U+10A22	71072	U+115A0	70439	U+11327
UTF-8	240 145 128 165	F0 91 80 A5	240 144 168 162	F0 90 A8 A2	240 145 150 160	F0 91 96 A0	240 145 140 167	F0 91 8C A7
UTF-16	55300 56357	D804 DC25	55298 56866	D802 DE22	55301 56736	D805 DDA0	55300 57127	D804 DF27
Numeric character reference	&#69669;	&#x11025;	&#68130;	&#x10A22;	&#71072;	&#x115A0;	&#70439;	&#x11327;

Character information
Preview			ྡྷ		𑨜		𑐢		𑰠		𑆣	
Unicode name	TIBETAN LETTER DHA		TIBETAN SUBJOINED LETTER DHA		ZANABAZAR SQUARE LETTER DHA		NEWA LETTER DHA		BHAIKSUKI LETTER DHA		SHARADA LETTER DHA	
Encodings	decimal	hex	dec	hex	dec	hex	dec	hex	dec	hex	dec	hex
Unicode	3922	U+0F52	4002	U+0FA2	72220	U+11A1C	70690	U+11422	72736	U+11C20	70051	U+111A3
UTF-8	224 189 146	E0 BD 92	224 190 162	E0 BE A2	240 145 168 156	F0 91 A8 9C	240 145 144 162	F0 91 90 A2	240 145 176 160	F0 91 B0 A0	240 145 134 163	F0 91 86 A3
UTF-16	3922	0F52	4002	0FA2	55302 56860	D806 DE1C	55301 56354	D805 DC22	55303 56352	D807 DC20	55300 56739	D804 DDA3
Numeric character reference	&#3922;	&#xF52;	&#4002;	&#xFA2;	&#72220;	&#x11A1C;	&#70690;	&#x11422;	&#72736;	&#x11C20;	&#70051;	&#x111A3;

Character information
Preview	ဓ		ᨵ		ᦒ	
Unicode name	MYANMAR LETTER DHA		TAI THAM LETTER LOW THA		NEW TAI LUE LETTER LOW THA	
Encodings	decimal	hex	dec	hex	dec	hex
Unicode	4115	U+1013	6709	U+1A35	6546	U+1992
UTF-8	225 128 147	E1 80 93	225 168 181	E1 A8 B5	225 166 146	E1 A6 92
Numeric character reference	&#4115;	&#x1013;	&#6709;	&#x1A35;	&#6546;	&#x1992;

Character information
Preview	ធ		ຘ		ธ	
Unicode name	KHMER LETTER THO		LAO LETTER PALI DHA		THAI CHARACTER THO THONG	
Encodings	decimal	hex	dec	hex	dec	hex
Unicode	6034	U+1792	3736	U+0E98	3608	U+0E18
UTF-8	225 158 146	E1 9E 92	224 186 152	E0 BA 98	224 184 152	E0 B8 98
Numeric character reference	&#6034;	&#x1792;	&#3736;	&#xE98;	&#3608;	&#xE18;

Character information
Preview	ධ		𑄙		𑜔		𑤞		ꢤ		ꨖ	
Unicode name	SINHALA LETTER MAHAAPRAANA DAYANNA		CHAKMA LETTER DHAA		AHOM LETTER DHA		DIVES AKURU LETTER DHA		SAURASHTRA LETTER DHA		CHAM LETTER DHA	
Encodings	decimal	hex	dec	hex	dec	hex	dec	hex	dec	hex	dec	hex
Unicode	3504	U+0DB0	69913	U+11119	71444	U+11714	71966	U+1191E	43172	U+A8A4	43542	U+AA16
UTF-8	224 182 176	E0 B6 B0	240 145 132 153	F0 91 84 99	240 145 156 148	F0 91 9C 94	240 145 164 158	F0 91 A4 9E	234 162 164	EA A2 A4	234 168 150	EA A8 96
UTF-16	3504	0DB0	55300 56601	D804 DD19	55301 57108	D805 DF14	55302 56606	D806 DD1E	43172	A8A4	43542	AA16
Numeric character reference	&#3504;	&#xDB0;	&#69913;	&#x11119;	&#71444;	&#x11714;	&#71966;	&#x1191E;	&#43172;	&#xA8A4;	&#43542;	&#xAA16;

Character information
Preview	𑘠		𑧀		𑩮		ꠗ		𑵹			
Unicode name	MODI LETTER DHA		NANDINAGARI LETTER DHA		SOYOMBO LETTER DHA		SYLOTI NAGRI LETTER DHO		GUNJALA GONDI LETTER DHA		KAITHI LETTER DHA	
Encodings	decimal	hex	dec	hex	dec	hex	dec	hex	dec	hex	dec	hex
Unicode	71200	U+11620	72128	U+119C0	72302	U+11A6E	43031	U+A817	73081	U+11D79	69793	U+110A1
UTF-8	240 145 152 160	F0 91 98 A0	240 145 167 128	F0 91 A7 80	240 145 169 174	F0 91 A9 AE	234 160 151	EA A0 97	240 145 181 185	F0 91 B5 B9	240 145 130 161	F0 91 82 A1
UTF-16	55301 56864	D805 DE20	55302 56768	D806 DDC0	55302 56942	D806 DE6E	43031	A817	55303 56697	D807 DD79	55300 56481	D804 DCA1
Numeric character reference	&#71200;	&#x11620;	&#72128;	&#x119C0;	&#72302;	&#x11A6E;	&#43031;	&#xA817;	&#73081;	&#x11D79;	&#69793;	&#x110A1;

Character information
Preview	𑒡		ᤎ		ꯙ	
Unicode name	TIRHUTA LETTER DHA		LIMBU LETTER DHA		MEETEI MAYEK LETTER DHOU	
Encodings	decimal	hex	dec	hex	dec	hex
Unicode	70817	U+114A1	6414	U+190E	43993	U+ABD9
UTF-8	240 145 146 161	F0 91 92 A1	225 164 142	E1 A4 8E	234 175 153	EA AF 99
UTF-16	55301 56481	D805 DCA1	6414	190E	43993	ABD9
Numeric character reference	&#70817;	&#x114A1;	&#6414;	&#x190E;	&#43993;	&#xABD9;

Character information
Preview	𑚜		𑠜		𑈝		𑋐		𑅦		𑊙	
Unicode name	TAKRI LETTER DHA		DOGRA LETTER DHA		KHOJKI LETTER DHA		KHUDAWADI LETTER DHA		MAHAJANI LETTER DHA		MULTANI LETTER DHA	
Encodings	decimal	hex	dec	hex	dec	hex	dec	hex	dec	hex	dec	hex
Unicode	71324	U+1169C	71708	U+1181C	70173	U+1121D	70352	U+112D0	69990	U+11166	70297	U+11299
UTF-8	240 145 154 156	F0 91 9A 9C	240 145 160 156	F0 91 A0 9C	240 145 136 157	F0 91 88 9D	240 145 139 144	F0 91 8B 90	240 145 133 166	F0 91 85 A6	240 145 138 153	F0 91 8A 99
UTF-16	55301 56988	D805 DE9C	55302 56348	D806 DC1C	55300 56861	D804 DE1D	55300 57040	D804 DED0	55300 56678	D804 DD66	55300 56985	D804 DE99
Numeric character reference	&#71324;	&#x1169C;	&#71708;	&#x1181C;	&#70173;	&#x1121D;	&#70352;	&#x112D0;	&#69990;	&#x11166;	&#70297;	&#x11299;

Character information
Preview	ᬥ		ꦣ	
Unicode name	BALINESE LETTER DA MADU		JAVANESE LETTER DA MAHAPRANA	
Encodings	decimal	hex	dec	hex
Unicode	6949	U+1B25	43427	U+A9A3
UTF-8	225 172 165	E1 AC A5	234 166 163	EA A6 A3
Numeric character reference	&#6949;	&#x1B25;	&#43427;	&#xA9A3;

Character information
Preview	𑴞	
Unicode name	MASARAM GONDI LETTER DHA	
Encodings	decimal	hex
Unicode	72990	U+11D1E
UTF-8	240 145 180 158	F0 91 B4 9E
UTF-16	55303 56606	D807 DD1E
Numeric character reference	&#72990;	&#x11D1E;
