= James Bert Garner =

American chemical engineer

James B. Garner at age 45 around the time he invented the gas mask.

Two associates of James Bert Garner wearing his original gas masks.

James Bert Garner (September 2, 1870 – November 28, 1960) was an American chemical engineer and professor at the Mellon Institute of Industrial Research from 1914 until his retirement in 1957. He is credited with the invention of a World War I gas mask design in 1915.

== Accomplishments ==
Garner graduated from Wabash College in 1893 with a Bachelor of Science degree and studied under the renowned Dr. Alexander Smith.

In 1895, after receiving a Master of Science degree from Wabash and teaching there, he went at Smith's invitation to the University of Chicago for a teaching appointment. This is where he was first exposed to the principle he later used in a charcoal gas mask. It was part of his duties to set up experiments on the lecture tables. In an effort to find a demonstration that would seem especially dramatic, he turned to a little used one from a well-known source-book, G. S. Newth's Chemical Lecture Experiments.

What his students saw was a long cylinder filled with mercury, immersed in a vessel also filled with mercury. When ammonia was generated through a glass delivery tube, the mercury in the beaker came down into the container vessel. That was when Garner applied the touch of drama. When he placed a stick of activated charcoal into the vessel the tube of the mercury again shot to the top of the cylinder.

Garner's purpose was to fix in his students' memory a mental picture of how ammonia gas was adsorbed by wood charcoal. It made an even more lasting impression upon the instructor but it was a good many years before he was able to make use of it..

In 1897, Garner received a Ph.D. in physical [organic] chemistry and became head of the chemistry department at Bradley Polytechnic Institute in Peoria, Illinois, where he taught until 1901 and continued these experiments.

From 1901 to 1914, Garner served as the head of the chemistry department at Wabash College. "For 14 years under Dr. Garner the Wabash chemistry department showed one of its greatest periods of productivity with at least 18 future Ph.D's graduated" (Ibid, p. 8).

=== Gas mask ===
After reading an account of a gas attack by the German Army on Canadian and French troops at the Battle of Gravenstafel near Ypres on April 22, 1915, Garner hypothesized that chlorine gas had been used. Based on research he had performed while at the University of Chicago he believed that activated charcoal would adsorb the gas. After performing a successful test using two of his associates who were exposed to gas in a sealed room while wearing Garner's gas mask.

The following excerpt relates to Garner's research into the gas mask.

Dr. James Bert Garner and his first gas mask was and is a Pittsburgh story, one of the many unpublicized ones which have taken place behind the walls of Oakland's Mellon Institute. Garner had a large family and needed a post with a higher income. He found it at the Mellon Institute in 1914, where he was assigned to a Metals Research Fellowship.

While working on methods of recovering sulphur dioxide from copper smelter gases, something happened to recall his favorite experiment at the University of Chicago. A Pittsburgh newspaper account (no exact reference) of action near Ypres, Belgium,, in 1915 actually was what led Garner toward his most notable scientific contribution. The article quoted a Cap. Bertram of the Eighty Canadian Battalion who reported 'a white smoke arising from the German trenches to a height of about 3 feet. Then, in front of the white smoke appeared a greenish cloud which drifted along the ground to our trenches, to rising more than about 7 feet from the ground. Men in the trenches were obliged to leave and a number of them were killed by the effects of the gas.

[Playing a hunch from his current work at Mellon Institute he] made use of the prepared charcoal technique of his lecture assistant days at the Univ. of Chicago. he found that it absorbed sulphur dioxide from the air stream, as well as the ammonia of the experiment. ... He guessed the British troops were overcome by chlorine gas. This, too, he believed could be adsorbed by activated charcoal. His then current work at the Institute had made use of the prepared charcoal technique of his ... days at the University of Chicago. He found that it adsorbed [not "absorbed"] sulphur dioxide from the air stream, as well as the ammonia of the experiment [Ibid, p. 8-9].

In addition to gas mask development, Garner was also involved in many other discoveries and inventions. For example, in June 1916 Garner patented a process of obtaining gasoline from natural gas, and in July 1936 he patented a process for extracting nicotine from tobacco, in addition to numerous other patents throughout his career.
