= John Mackintosh Howie =

British mathematician

- Born: 23 May 1936
- Died: 26 December 2011 (aged 75)
- Education: University of Oxford
- Awards: Keith Prize
- Scientific career
- Fields: Mathematics
- Workplaces: University of St Andrews
- Thesis: Some Problems on the Theory of Semigroups (1962)
- Doctoral advisor: Graham Higman

John Mackintosh Howie CBE FRSE (23 May 1936 – 26 December 2011) was a Scottish mathematician and prominent semigroup theorist.

== Biography ==
Howie was educated at Robert Gordon's College, Aberdeen, the University of Aberdeen and Balliol College, Oxford, where he wrote a Ph.D. thesis under the direction of Graham Higman.

In 1966 the University of Stirling was established with Walter D. Munn (fr) at head of the department of mathematics. Munn recruited Howie to teach there.

According to Christopher Hollings,

...a 'British school' of semigroup theory cannot be said to have taken off properly until the mid-1960s when John M. Howie completed an Oxford DPhil in semigroup theory (partly under Preston's influence) and Munn began to supervise research students in semigroups (most notably, Norman R. Reilly).

He won the Keith Prize of the Royal Society of Edinburgh, 1979–81. He was Regius Professor of Mathematics at the University of St Andrews from 1970 to 1997. No successor to this chair was named until 2015 when Igor Rivin was appointed.

Howie was charged with reviewing universal, comprehensive secondary education in Scotland, which was viewed as failing its students. Impressed with education in Denmark, his committee proposed a tracking scheme to improve academic outcomes, and communicated recommendations in Upper Secondary Education in Scotland (1992).

== Public appointments ==
- Mathematics Panel, Scottish Examination Board 1967–1973; Convener from 1970
- Chairman, Scottish Central Committee for Mathematics 1975–1981
- President, Edinburgh Mathematical Society 1973–74
- London Mathematical Society:
  - Council 1982–1988, 1989–1992
  - Vice-president 1986–1988, 1990–1992
  - Chairman of Education Committee 1985–1989
  - Chairman of Public Affairs Committee 1990–1992
- Member of Dunning Committee 1975–1977
- Chairman of Governors, Dundee College of Education 1983–1987
- Governor, Northern College of Education 1987–2001
- Chairman, Scottish Mathematical Council 1987–1993
- Chairman, Committee to review fifth and sixth years (Howie Committee) 1990–1992
- Council, Royal Society of Edinburgh 1992–1995
- Chairman, Steering Committee, International Centre for Mathematical Sciences 1991–1997

== Books ==
- 1976: An Introduction to Semigroup Theory, Academic Press MR 0466355
- 1991: Automata and Languages, Clarendon Press ISBN 0-19-853424-8 MR 1254435
- 1992: Upper Secondary Education in Scotland (Howie Report)
- 1995: Fundamentals of Semigroup Theory, Clarendon Press ISBN 0-19-851194-9 MR 1455373
- 2001: Real Analysis, Springer books ISBN 1-85233-314-6 MR 1826051
- 2003: Complex Analysis, Springer books ISBN 1-85233-733-8 MR 1975725
- 2006: Fields and Galois Theory, Springer books ISBN 978-1-85233-986-9 MR 2180311
