= Harold Stanley Ruse =

English mathematician

Harold Stanley Ruse (12 February 1905 – 20 October 1974) was an English mathematician, noteworthy for the development of the concept of locally harmonic spaces. He was Professor of Pure Mathematics at the University of Leeds.

== Early life and education ==
Ruse was born in Hastings, Sussex in 1905, the son of Frederick Ruse, a greengrocer and his wife, Lydia. He was educated at Hastings Grammar School and then studied Mathematics at Jesus College, Oxford, graduating with the degree of BA (later converted to MA). In 1927 he went to the University of Edinburgh as a Bruce of Grangehill research scholar. He was awarded the degree of DSc by Edinburgh five years later.

== Academic career ==
Ruse remained at Edinburgh where he was appointed lecturer in mathematics in 1928. Additionally, he spent the academic year 1933–34 as a Rockefeller Research Fellow at Princeton University. He was to return to Princeton again in 1952–53.

Ruse became Professor of Mathematics at University College, Southampton (now the University of Southampton) in 1937 and in 1946 was appointed Professor of Pure Mathematics at the University of Leeds. At Leeds he was Head of the Department of Mathematics from 1948 to 1968 and then Chairman of the School of Mathematics from 1968 to 1970 when he retired as emeritus professor.

Ruse was a member of the Edinburgh Mathematical Society from 1927, the Society's secretary from 1930 to 1933 and its president for one year from 1935 to 1936. He became a member of the London Mathematical Society in 1929, a member of its Council from 1938 to 1945 and its vice-president for one year from 1942 to 1943.

Ruse is credited for introducing the theory of bitensors in his 1931 paper An Absolute Partial Differential Calculus.

== Honours ==
In 1931 Ruse was elected a Fellow of the Royal Society of Edinburgh (FRSE). His proposers were Sir Edmund Taylor Whittaker, Sir Charles Galton Darwin, Edward Thomas Copson and Charles Glover Barkla.

The RSE awarded him the Keith Medal for an outstanding scientific paper published during 1935–1937 in the RSE's scientific journals.

He was an Invited Speaker of the ICM in 1936 in Oslo.

== Death ==
Ruse died suddenly in Leeds in 1974 at the age of 69. On the day before his death he had attended an algebra seminar at the university. He was unmarried and had no children.
