= Tim Austin =

Tim Austin may refer to:

- Tim Austin (boxer) (born 1971), American boxer
- Tim Austin (mathematician), British mathematician
- Tim Austin (musician), American bluegrass musician
