= Gha (Indic) =

Letter "Gha" in Indic scripts

Example glyphs
- Bengali–Assamese: Gha
- Tibetan: གྷ
- Thai: ฆ
- Malayalam: ഘ
- Sinhala: ඝ
- Ashoka Brahmi: Gha
- Devanagari: Gha

Cognates
- Hebrew: ח
- Greek: Η, Ͱ
- Latin: H
- Cyrillic: И

Properties
- Phonemic representation: /gʱ/ /kʰ/^{B}
- IAST transliteration: gha Gha
- ISCII code point: B6 (182)

Gha is the fourth consonant of Indic abugidas. In modern Indic scripts, gha is derived from the early "Ashoka" Brahmi letter 𑀖, which is probably derived from the Aramaic 𐡇 ("H/X") after having gone through the Gupta letter.

== Āryabhaṭa numeration ==
Aryabhata used Devanagari letters for numbers, very similar to the Greek numerals, even after the invention of Indian numerals. The values of the different forms of घ are:

- घ [gʱə] = 4 (४)
- घि [gʱi] = 400 (४००)
- घु [gʱu] = 40,000 (४० ०००)
- घृ [gʱr̩] = 4,000,000 (४० ०० ०००)
- घॢ [gʱl̩] = 4×10^{8} (४०^{८})
- घे [gʱeː] = 4×10^{10} (४०^{१०})
- घै [gʱəi̯] = 4×10^{12} (४०^{१२})
- घो [gʱoː] = 4×10^{14} (४०^{१४})
- घौ [gʱəu̯] = 4×10^{16} (४०^{१६})

== Historic Gha ==
There are three different general early historic scripts - Brahmi and its variants, Kharoṣṭhī, and Tocharian, the so-called slanting Brahmi. Gha as found in standard Brahmi, was a simple geometric shape, with variations toward more flowing forms by the Gupta. The Tocharian Gha did not have an alternate Fremdzeichen form. The third form of gha, in Kharoshthi was probably derived from Aramaic separately from the Brahmi letter.

=== Brahmi Gha ===
The Brahmi letter, Gha, is probably derived from the Aramaic Heth, and is thus related to the modern Latin H and Greek Eta. Several identifiable styles of writing the Brahmi Gha can be found, most associated with a specific set of inscriptions from an artifact or diverse records from an historic period. As the earliest and most geometric style of Brahmi, the letters found on the Edicts of Ashoka and other records from around that time are normally the reference form for Brahmi letters, with vowel marks not attested until later forms of Brahmi back-formed to match the geometric writing style.

Brahmi Gha historic forms
Ashoka (3rd-1st c. BCE)	Girnar (~150 BCE)	Kushana (~150-250 CE)	Gujarat (~250 CE)	Gupta (~350 CE)

=== Tocharian Gha ===
The Tocharian letter is derived from the Brahmi, but does not have an alternate Fremdzeichen form.

Tocharian Gha with vowel marks
Gha	Ghā	Ghi	Ghī	Ghu	Ghū	Ghr	Ghr̄	Ghe	Ghai	Gho	Ghau	Ghä

=== Kharoṣṭhī Gha ===
The Kharoṣṭhī letter is generally accepted as being derived from the Aramaic Heth, and is thus related to H and Eta, in addition to the Brahmi Gha.

== Devanagari script ==
Gha (घ) is the fourth consonant of the Devanagari abugida. It ultimately arose from the Brahmi letter, after having gone through the Gupta letter. Letters that derive from it are the Gujarati letter ઘ and the Modi letter 𑘑.

=== Devanagari-using Languages ===
In all languages, घ is pronounced as [gʱə] or [gʱ] when appropriate. Like all Indic scripts, Devanagari uses vowel marks attached to the base consonant to override the inherent /ə/ vowel:

Devanagari घ with vowel marks
Gha	Ghā	Ghi	Ghī	Ghu	Ghū	Ghr	Ghr̄	Ghl	Ghl̄	Ghe	Ghai	Gho	Ghau	Gh
घ	घा	घि	घी	घु	घू	घृ	घॄ	घॢ	घॣ	घे	घै	घो	घौ	घ्

=== Conjuncts with घ ===
Half form of Gha.

Devanagari exhibits conjunct ligatures, as is common in Indic scripts. In modern Devanagari texts, most conjuncts are formed by reducing the letter shape to fit tightly to the following letter, usually by dropping a character's vertical stem, sometimes referred to as a "half form". Some conjunct clusters are always represented by a true ligature, instead of a shape that can be broken into constituent independent letters. Vertically stacked conjuncts are ubiquitous in older texts, while only a few are still used routinely in modern Devanagari texts. The use of ligatures and vertical conjuncts may vary across languages using the Devanagari script, with Marathi in particular preferring the use of half forms where texts in other languages would show ligatures and vertical stacks.

==== Ligature conjuncts of घ ====
True ligatures are quite rare in Indic scripts. The most common ligated conjuncts in Devanagari are in the form of a slight mutation to fit in context or as a consistent variant form appended to the adjacent characters. Those variants include Na and the Repha and Rakar forms of Ra. Nepali and Marathi texts use the "eyelash" Ra half form for an initial "R" instead of repha.

- Repha र্ (r) + घ (ɡʱa) gives the ligature rɡʱa: ^{note}

- Eyelash र্ (r) + घ (ɡʱa) gives the ligature rɡʱa:

- घ্ (ɡʱ) + rakar र (ra) gives the ligature ɡʱra:

- घ্ (ɡʱ) + न (na) gives the ligature ɡʱna:

- द্ (d) + घ (ɡʱa) gives the ligature dɡʱa:

==== Stacked conjuncts of घ ====
Vertically stacked ligatures are the most common conjunct forms found in Devanagari text. Although the constituent characters may need to be stretched and moved slightly in order to stack neatly, stacked conjuncts can be broken down into recognizable base letters, or a letter and an otherwise standard ligature.

- छ্ (cʰ) + घ (ɡʱa) gives the ligature cʰɡʱa:

- ढ্ (ḍʱ) + घ (ɡʱa) gives the ligature ḍʱɡʱa:

- ड্ (ḍ) + घ (ɡʱa) gives the ligature ḍɡʱa:

- घ্ (ɡʱ) + च (ca) gives the ligature ɡʱca:

- घ্ (ɡʱ) + ड (ḍa) gives the ligature ɡʱḍa:

- घ্ (ɡʱ) + ज (ja) gives the ligature ɡʱja:

- घ্ (ɡʱ) + ज্ (j) + ञ (ña) gives the ligature ɡʱjña:

- घ্ (ɡʱ) + ल (la) gives the ligature ɡʱla:

- घ্ (ɡʱ) + ङ (ŋa) gives the ligature ɡʱŋa:

- घ্ (ɡʱ) + ञ (ña) gives the ligature ɡʱña:

- ङ্ (ŋ) + घ (ɡʱa) gives the ligature ŋɡʱa:

- ट্ (ṭ) + घ (ɡʱa) gives the ligature ṭɡʱa:

- ठ্ (ṭʰ) + घ (ɡʱa) gives the ligature ṭʰɡʱa:

== Bengali script ==
The Bengali script ঘ is derived from the Siddhaṃ, and is marked by a similar horizontal head line, but less geometric shape, than its Devanagari counterpart, घ. The inherent vowel of Bengali consonant letters is /ɔ/, so the bare letter ঘ will sometimes be transliterated as "gho" instead of "gha". Adding okar, the "o" vowel mark, gives a reading of /ɡʱo/. Like all Indic consonants, ঘ can be modified by marks to indicate another (or no) vowel than its inherent "a".

Bengali ঘ with vowel marks
gha	ghā	ghi	ghī	ghu	ghū	ghr	ghr̄	ghe	ghai	gho	ghau	gh
ঘ	ঘা	ঘি	ঘী	ঘু	ঘূ	ঘৃ	ঘৄ	ঘে	ঘৈ	ঘো	ঘৌ	ঘ্

=== ঘ in Bengali-using languages ===
ঘ is used as a basic consonant character in all of the major Bengali script orthographies, including Bengali and Assamese.

=== Conjuncts with ঘ ===
Bengali ঘ exhibits conjunct ligatures, as is common in Indic scripts, with both stacked ligatures being common.

- দ্ (d) + ঘ (ɡʱa) gives the ligature dɡʱa:

- ঘ্ (ɡʱ) + ন (na) gives the ligature ɡʱna:

- ঘ্ (ɡʱ) + র (ra) gives the ligature ɡʱra, with the ra phala suffix:

- ঘ্ (ɡʱ) + য (ya) gives the ligature ɡʱya, with the ya phala suffix:

- ঙ্ (ŋ) + ঘ (ɡʱa) gives the ligature ŋɡʱa:

- ঙ্ (ŋ) + ঘ্ (ɡʱ) + র (ra) gives the ligature ŋɡʱra, with the ra phala suffix:

- ঙ্ (ŋ) + ঘ্ (ɡʱ) + য (ya) gives the ligature ŋɡʱya, with the ya phala suffix:

- র্ (r) + ঘ (ɡʱa) gives the ligature rɡʱa, with the repha prefix:

- র্ (r) + ঘ্ (ɡʱ) + য (ya) gives the ligature rɡʱya, with the repha prefix and ya phala suffix:

== Gurmukhi script ==
Kagaa [kə̀gːɑ] (ਘ) is the ninth letter of the Gurmukhi alphabet. Its name is [kʰəkʰːɑ] and pronounced as /kə̀/. To differentiate between consonants, the Punjabi tonal consonant kà is often transliterated in the way of the Hindi voiced aspirate consonants gha although Punjabi does not have this sound. It is derived from the Laṇḍā letter gha, and ultimately from the Brahmi ga. Gurmukhi kagaa does not have a special pairin or addha (reduced) form for making conjuncts, and in modern Punjabi texts do not take a half form or halant to indicate the bare consonant /k/, although Gurmukhi Sanskrit texts may use an explicit halant.

== Gujarati Gha ==
Gujarati Gha.

Gha (ઘ) is the fourth consonant of the Gujarati abugida. It is derived from the 16th century Devanagari Gha with the top bar (shiro rekha) removed, and ultimately from the Brahmi letter. ઘ (Gha) is similar in appearance to ધ (Dha), and care should be taken to avoid confusing the two when reading Gujarati script texts.

=== Gujarati-using Languages ===
The Gujarati script is used to write the Gujarati and Kutchi languages. In both languages, ઘ is pronounced as [ɡʱə] or [ɡʱ] when appropriate. Like all Indic scripts, Gujarati uses vowel marks attached to the base consonant to override the inherent /ə/ vowel:

Gha	Ghā	Ghi	Ghī	Ghu	Ghū	Ghr	Ghl	Ghr̄	Ghl̄	Ghĕ	Ghe	Ghai	Ghŏ	Gho	Ghau	Gh
Gujarati Gha syllables, with vowel marks in red.

=== Conjuncts with ઘ ===
Half form of Gha.

Gujarati ઘ exhibits conjunct ligatures, much like its parent Devanagari Script. Most Gujarati conjuncts can only be formed by reducing the letter shape to fit tightly to the following letter, usually by dropping a character's vertical stem, sometimes referred to as a "half form". A few conjunct clusters can be represented by a true ligature, instead of a shape that can be broken into constituent independent letters, and vertically stacked conjuncts can also be found in Gujarati, although much less commonly than in Devanagari. True ligatures are quite rare in Indic scripts. The most common ligated conjuncts in Gujarati are in the form of a slight mutation to fit in context or as a consistent variant form appended to the adjacent characters. Those variants include Na and the Repha and Rakar forms of Ra.

- ર્ (r) + ઘ (ɡʱa) gives the ligature RGha:

- ઘ્ (ɡʱ) + ર (ra) gives the ligature GhRa:

- ઘ્ (ɡʱ) + ન (na) gives the ligature GhNa:

- દ્ (d) + ઘ (ɡʱa) gives the ligature DGha:

== Telugu Gha ==
Telugu independent and subjoined Gha.

Gha (ఘ) is a consonant of the Telugu abugida. It ultimately arose from the Brahmi letter. It is closely related to the Kannada letter ಘ. Most Telugu consonants contain a v-shaped headstroke that is related to the horizontal headline found in other Indic scripts, although headstrokes do not connect adjacent letters in Telugu. The headstroke is normally lost when adding vowel matras. Telugu conjuncts are created by reducing trailing letters to a subjoined form that appears below the initial consonant of the conjunct. Many subjoined forms are created by dropping their headline, with many extending the end of the stroke of the main letter body to form an extended tail reaching up to the right of the preceding consonant. This subjoining of trailing letters to create conjuncts is in contrast to the leading half forms of Devanagari and Bengali letters. Ligature conjuncts are not a feature in Telugu, with the only non-standard construction being an alternate subjoined form of Ṣa (borrowed from Kannada) in the KṢa conjunct.

== Malayalam Gha ==
Malayalam letter Gha

Gha (ഘ) is a consonant of the Malayalam abugida. It ultimately arose from the Brahmi letter, via the Grantha letter Gha. Like in other Indic scripts, Malayalam consonants have the inherent vowel "a", and take one of several modifying vowel signs to represent syllables with another vowel or no vowel at all.

Malayalam Gha matras: Gha, Ghā, Ghi, Ghī, Ghu, Ghū, Ghr̥, Ghr̥̄, Ghl̥, Ghl̥̄, Ghe, Ghē, Ghai, Gho, Ghō, Ghau, and Gh.

=== Conjuncts of ഘ ===
As is common in Indic scripts, Malayalam joins letters together to form conjunct consonant clusters. There are several ways in which conjuncts are formed in Malayalam texts: using a post-base form of a trailing consonant placed under the initial consonant of a conjunct, a combined ligature of two or more consonants joined together, a conjoining form that appears as a combining mark on the rest of the conjunct, the use of an explicit candrakkala mark to suppress the inherent "a" vowel, or a special consonant form called a "chillu" letter, representing a bare consonant without the inherent "a" vowel. Texts written with the modern reformed Malayalam orthography, put̪iya lipi, may favor more regular conjunct forms than older texts in paḻaya lipi, due to changes undertaken in the 1970s by the Government of Kerala.

- ഗ് (g) + ഘ (ɡʱa) gives the ligature gɡʱa:

- ഘ് (ɡʱ) + ന (na) gives the ligature ɡʱna:

- ഘ് (ɡʱ) + ര (ra) gives the ligature ɡʱra:

== Thai script ==
Kho ra-khang (ฆ) is the sixth letter of the Thai alphabet. It falls under the low class of Thai consonants. In IPA, kho ra-khang is pronounced as [kʰ] at the beginning of a syllable and is pronounced as [k̚] at the end of a syllable. The second and third letters of the alphabet, kho khai (ข) and kho khuat (ฃ), are also named kho, however, they all fall under the high class of Thai consonants. The fourth and the fifth letters of the alphabet, kho khwai (ค), kho khon (ฅ), and kho ra-khang (ฆ), are also named kho and fall under the low class of Thai consonants. Unlike many Indic scripts, Thai consonants do not form conjunct ligatures, and use the pinthu—an explicit virama with a dot shape—to indicate bare consonants. In the acrophony of the Thai script, ra-khang (ระฆัง) means ‘bell’. Kho ra-khang corresponds to the Sanskrit character ‘घ’.

== Odia Gha ==
Odia independent and subjoined letter Gha.

Gha (ଘ) is a consonant of the Odia abugida. It ultimately arose from the Brahmi letter, via the Siddhaṃ letter Gha. Like in other Indic scripts, Odia consonants have the inherent vowel "a", and take one of several modifying vowel signs to represent syllables with another vowel or no vowel at all.

Odia Gha with vowel matras
Gha	Ghā	Ghi	Ghī	Ghu	Ghū	Ghr̥	Ghr̥̄	Ghl̥	Ghl̥̄	Ghe	Ghai	Gho	Ghau	Gh
ଘ	ଘା	ଘି	ଘୀ	ଘୁ	ଘୂ	ଘୃ	ଘୄ	ଘୢ	ଘୣ	ଘେ	ଘୈ	ଘୋ	ଘୌ	ଘ୍

=== Conjuncts of ଘ ===
As is common in Indic scripts, Odia joins letters together to form conjunct consonant clusters. The most common conjunct formation is achieved by using a small subjoined form of trailing consonants. Most consonants' subjoined forms are identical to the full form, just reduced in size, although a few drop the curved headline or have a subjoined form not directly related to the full form of the consonant. The second type of conjunct formation is through pure ligatures, where the constituent consonants are written together in a single graphic form. This ligature may be recognizable as being a combination of two characters or it can have a conjunct ligature unrelated to its constituent characters.

- ଙ୍ (ŋ) + ଘ (ɡʱa) gives the ligature ŋɡʱa:

- ର୍ (r) + ଘ (ɡʱa) gives the ligature rɡʱa:

- ଘ୍ (ɡʱ) + ର (ra) gives the ligature ɡʱra:

== Kaithi Gha ==
Kaithi consonant and half-form Gha.

Gha (𑂐) is a consonant of the Kaithi abugida. It ultimately arose from the Brahmi letter, via the Siddhaṃ letter Gha. Like in other Indic scripts, Kaithi consonants have the inherent vowel "a", and take one of several modifying vowel signs to represent syllables with another vowel or no vowel at all.

Kaithi Gha with vowel matras
Gha	Ghā	Ghi	Ghī	Ghu	Ghū	Ghe	Ghai	Gho	Ghau	Gh
𑂐	𑂐𑂰	𑂐𑂱	𑂐𑂲	𑂐𑂳	𑂐𑂴	𑂐𑂵	𑂐𑂶	𑂐𑂷	𑂐𑂸	𑂐𑂹

=== Conjuncts of 𑂐 ===
As is common in Indic scripts, Kaithi joins letters together to form conjunct consonant clusters. The most common conjunct formation is achieved by using a half form of preceding consonants, although several consonants use an explicit virama. Most half forms are derived from the full form by removing the vertical stem. As is common in most Indic scripts, conjuncts of ra are indicated with a repha or rakar mark attached to the rest of the consonant cluster. In addition, there are a few vertical conjuncts that can be found in Kaithi writing, but true ligatures are not used in the modern Kaithi script.

- 𑂐୍ (ɡʱ) + 𑂩 (ra) gives the ligature ɡʱra:

- 𑂩୍ (r) + 𑂐 (ɡʱa) gives the ligature rɡʱa:

== Tirhuta Gha ==
Tirhuta consonant Gha

Gha (𑒒) is a consonant of the Tirhuta abugida. It ultimately arose from the Brahmi letter, via the Siddhaṃ letter Gha. Like in other Indic scripts, Tirhuta consonants have the inherent vowel "a", and take one of several modifying vowel signs to represent sylables with another vowel or no vowel at all.

Tirhuta Gha with vowel matras
Gha	Ghā	Ghi	Ghī	Ghu	Ghū	Ghṛ	Ghṝ	Ghḷ	Ghḹ	Ghē	Ghe	Ghai	Ghō	Gho	Ghau	Gh
𑒒	𑒒𑒰	𑒒𑒱	𑒒𑒲	𑒒𑒳	𑒒𑒴	𑒒𑒵	𑒒𑒶	𑒒𑒷	𑒒𑒸	𑒒𑒹	𑒒𑒺	𑒒𑒻	𑒒𑒼	𑒒𑒽	𑒒𑒾	𑒒𑓂

=== Conjuncts of 𑒒 ===
As is common in Indic scripts, Tirhuta joins letters together to form conjunct consonant clusters. The most common conjunct formation is achieved by using an explicit virama. As is common in most Indic scripts, conjuncts of ra are indicated with a repha or rakar mark attached to the rest of the consonant cluster. In addition, other consonants take unique combining forms when in conjunct with other letters, and there are several vertical conjuncts and true ligatures that can be found in Tirhuta writing.

- 𑒒୍ (ɡʱ) + 𑒩 (ra) gives the ligature ɡʱra:

- 𑒒୍ (ɡʱ) + 𑒫 (va) gives the ligature ɡʱva:

- 𑒓୍ (ŋ) + 𑒒 (ɡʱa) gives the ligature ŋɡʱa:

- 𑒩୍ (r) + 𑒒 (ɡʱa) gives the ligature rɡʱa:

- 𑒞୍ (t) + 𑒒 (ɡʱa) gives the ligature tɡʱa:

== Comparison of Gha ==
The various Indic scripts are generally related to each other through adaptation and borrowing, and as such the glyphs for cognate letters, including Gha, are related as well.

Comparison of Gha in different scripts

Aramaic
Kharoṣṭhī 𐨓	Ashoka Brahmi	Kushana Brahmi (Note: The middle "Kushana" form of Brahmi is a later style that emerged as Brahmi scripts were beginning to proliferate. Gupta Brahmi was definitely a stylistic descendant from Kushana, but other Brahmi-derived scripts may have descended from earlier forms.)	Tocharian (Note: Tocharian is probably derived from the middle period "Kushana" form of Brahmi, although artifacts from that time are not plentiful enough to establish a definite succession.)
Gupta Brahmi	Pallava
Kadamba -
Bhaiksuki 𑰑	Siddhaṃ	Grantha 𑌘	Cham ꨉ
Sinhala ඝ	Pyu / Old Mon (Note: Pyu and Old Mon are probably the precursors of the Burmese script, and may be derived from either the Pallava or Kadamba script) -
Tibetan གྷ	Newa 𑐑	Ahom 𑜗	Malayalam ഘ
Telugu ఘ	Burmese ဃ
Lepcha -	Ranjana	Saurashtra ꢕ	Dives Akuru 𑤏
Kannada ಘ	Kayah Li -
Limbu ᤄ	Soyombo (Note: May also be derived from Devangari (see bottom left of table)) 𑩟	Khmer ឃ	Tamil -
Chakma 𑄊	Tai Tham ᨥ
Meitei Mayek ꯘ	Gaudi -	Thai ฆ	Lao ຆ
Tai Le -
Marchen -	Tirhuta 𑒒	New Tai Lue -	Tai Viet -	Aksara Kawi
'Phags-pa -	Odia ଘ	Sharada 𑆔	Rejang -	Batak -	Buginese -
Zanabazar Square 𑨎	Bengali–Assamese	Takri 𑚍	Javanese ꦓ	Balinese ᬖ	Makasar -
Hangul (Note: The Origin of Hangul from 'Phags-pa is one of limited influence, inspiring at most a few basic letter shapes. Hangul does not function as an Indic abugida.) -	Northern Nagari -	Dogri 𑠍	Laṇḍā -	Sundanese -	Baybayin -
Modi 𑘑	Gujarati ઘ	Khojki 𑈌	Khudabadi 𑊾	Mahajani 𑅘	Tagbanwa -
Devanagari	Nandinagari 𑦱	Kaithi	Gurmukhi ਘ	Multani 𑊈	Buhid -
Canadian Syllabics (Note: Although the basic letter forms of the Canadian Aboriginal Syllabics were derived from handwritten Devanagari letters, this abugida indicates vowel sounds by rotations of the letter form, rather than the use of vowel diacritics as is standard in Indic abugidas.) -	Soyombo (Note: May also be derived from Ranjana (see above)) 𑩟	Sylheti Nagari ꠊ	Gunjala Gondi 𑵷	Masaram Gondi (Note: Masaram Gondi acts as an Indic abugida, but its letterforms were not derived from any single precursor script.) 𑴏	Hanuno'o -

== Character encodings of Gha ==
Most Indic scripts are encoded in the Unicode Standard, and as such the letter Gha in those scripts can be represented in plain text with unique codepoint. Gha from several modern-use scripts can also be found in legacy encodings, such as ISCII.

Character information
Preview					ఘ		ଘ		ಘ		ഘ		ઘ		ਘ	
Unicode name	DEVANAGARI LETTER GHA		BENGALI LETTER GHA		TELUGU LETTER GHA		ORIYA LETTER GHA		KANNADA LETTER GHA		MALAYALAM LETTER GHA		GUJARATI LETTER GHA		GURMUKHI LETTER GHA	
Encodings	decimal	hex	dec	hex	dec	hex	dec	hex	dec	hex	dec	hex	dec	hex	dec	hex
Unicode	2328	U+0918	2456	U+0998	3096	U+0C18	2840	U+0B18	3224	U+0C98	3352	U+0D18	2712	U+0A98	2584	U+0A18
UTF-8	224 164 152	E0 A4 98	224 166 152	E0 A6 98	224 176 152	E0 B0 98	224 172 152	E0 AC 98	224 178 152	E0 B2 98	224 180 152	E0 B4 98	224 170 152	E0 AA 98	224 168 152	E0 A8 98
Numeric character reference	&#2328;	&#x918;	&#2456;	&#x998;	&#3096;	&#xC18;	&#2840;	&#xB18;	&#3224;	&#xC98;	&#3352;	&#xD18;	&#2712;	&#xA98;	&#2584;	&#xA18;
ISCII	182	B6	182	B6	182	B6	182	B6	182	B6	182	B6	182	B6	182	B6

Character information
Preview	Ashoka Kushana Gupta		𐨓				𑌘	
Unicode name	BRAHMI LETTER GHA		KHAROSHTHI LETTER GHA		SIDDHAM LETTER NGA		GRANTHA LETTER GHA	
Encodings	decimal	hex	dec	hex	dec	hex	dec	hex
Unicode	69654	U+11016	68115	U+10A13	71058	U+11592	70424	U+11318
UTF-8	240 145 128 150	F0 91 80 96	240 144 168 147	F0 90 A8 93	240 145 150 146	F0 91 96 92	240 145 140 152	F0 91 8C 98
UTF-16	55300 56342	D804 DC16	55298 56851	D802 DE13	55301 56722	D805 DD92	55300 57112	D804 DF18
Numeric character reference	&#69654;	&#x11016;	&#68115;	&#x10A13;	&#71058;	&#x11592;	&#70424;	&#x11318;

Character information
Preview	གྷ		ྒྷ		𑨎		𑐑		𑰑		𑆔	
Unicode name	TIBETAN LETTER GHA		TIBETAN SUBJOINED LETTER GHA		ZANABAZAR SQUARE LETTER GHA		NEWA LETTER GHA		BHAIKSUKI LETTER GHA		SHARADA LETTER GHA	
Encodings	decimal	hex	dec	hex	dec	hex	dec	hex	dec	hex	dec	hex
Unicode	3907	U+0F43	3987	U+0F93	72206	U+11A0E	70673	U+11411	72721	U+11C11	70036	U+11194
UTF-8	224 189 131	E0 BD 83	224 190 147	E0 BE 93	240 145 168 142	F0 91 A8 8E	240 145 144 145	F0 91 90 91	240 145 176 145	F0 91 B0 91	240 145 134 148	F0 91 86 94
UTF-16	3907	0F43	3987	0F93	55302 56846	D806 DE0E	55301 56337	D805 DC11	55303 56337	D807 DC11	55300 56724	D804 DD94
Numeric character reference	&#3907;	&#xF43;	&#3987;	&#xF93;	&#72206;	&#x11A0E;	&#70673;	&#x11411;	&#72721;	&#x11C11;	&#70036;	&#x11194;

Character information
Preview	ဃ		ᨥ	
Unicode name	MYANMAR LETTER GHA		TAI THAM LETTER LOW KHA	
Encodings	decimal	hex	dec	hex
Unicode	4099	U+1003	6693	U+1A25
UTF-8	225 128 131	E1 80 83	225 168 165	E1 A8 A5
Numeric character reference	&#4099;	&#x1003;	&#6693;	&#x1A25;

Character information
Preview	ឃ		ຆ		ฆ	
Unicode name	KHMER LETTER KHO		LAO LETTER PALI GHA		THAI CHARACTER KHO RAKHANG	
Encodings	decimal	hex	dec	hex	dec	hex
Unicode	6019	U+1783	3718	U+0E86	3590	U+0E06
UTF-8	225 158 131	E1 9E 83	224 186 134	E0 BA 86	224 184 134	E0 B8 86
Numeric character reference	&#6019;	&#x1783;	&#3718;	&#xE86;	&#3590;	&#xE06;

Character information
Preview	ඝ		𑄊		𑜗		𑤏		ꢕ		ꨉ	
Unicode name	SINHALA LETTER MAHAAPRAANA GAYANNA		CHAKMA LETTER GHAA		AHOM LETTER GHA		DIVES AKURU LETTER GHA		SAURASHTRA LETTER GHA		CHAM LETTER GHA	
Encodings	decimal	hex	dec	hex	dec	hex	dec	hex	dec	hex	dec	hex
Unicode	3485	U+0D9D	69898	U+1110A	71447	U+11717	71951	U+1190F	43157	U+A895	43529	U+AA09
UTF-8	224 182 157	E0 B6 9D	240 145 132 138	F0 91 84 8A	240 145 156 151	F0 91 9C 97	240 145 164 143	F0 91 A4 8F	234 162 149	EA A2 95	234 168 137	EA A8 89
UTF-16	3485	0D9D	55300 56586	D804 DD0A	55301 57111	D805 DF17	55302 56591	D806 DD0F	43157	A895	43529	AA09
Numeric character reference	&#3485;	&#xD9D;	&#69898;	&#x1110A;	&#71447;	&#x11717;	&#71951;	&#x1190F;	&#43157;	&#xA895;	&#43529;	&#xAA09;

Character information
Preview	𑘑		𑦱		𑩟		ꠊ		𑵷			
Unicode name	MODI LETTER GHA		NANDINAGARI LETTER GHA		SOYOMBO LETTER GHA		SYLOTI NAGRI LETTER GHO		GUNJALA GONDI LETTER GHA		KAITHI LETTER GHA	
Encodings	decimal	hex	dec	hex	dec	hex	dec	hex	dec	hex	dec	hex
Unicode	71185	U+11611	72113	U+119B1	72287	U+11A5F	43018	U+A80A	73079	U+11D77	69776	U+11090
UTF-8	240 145 152 145	F0 91 98 91	240 145 166 177	F0 91 A6 B1	240 145 169 159	F0 91 A9 9F	234 160 138	EA A0 8A	240 145 181 183	F0 91 B5 B7	240 145 130 144	F0 91 82 90
UTF-16	55301 56849	D805 DE11	55302 56753	D806 DDB1	55302 56927	D806 DE5F	43018	A80A	55303 56695	D807 DD77	55300 56464	D804 DC90
Numeric character reference	&#71185;	&#x11611;	&#72113;	&#x119B1;	&#72287;	&#x11A5F;	&#43018;	&#xA80A;	&#73079;	&#x11D77;	&#69776;	&#x11090;

Character information
Preview	𑒒		ᤄ		ꯘ	
Unicode name	TIRHUTA LETTER GHA		LIMBU LETTER GHA		MEETEI MAYEK LETTER GHOU	
Encodings	decimal	hex	dec	hex	dec	hex
Unicode	70802	U+11492	6404	U+1904	43992	U+ABD8
UTF-8	240 145 146 146	F0 91 92 92	225 164 132	E1 A4 84	234 175 152	EA AF 98
UTF-16	55301 56466	D805 DC92	6404	1904	43992	ABD8
Numeric character reference	&#70802;	&#x11492;	&#6404;	&#x1904;	&#43992;	&#xABD8;

Character information
Preview	𑚍		𑠍		𑈌		𑊾		𑅘		𑊈	
Unicode name	TAKRI LETTER GHA		DOGRA LETTER GHA		KHOJKI LETTER GHA		KHUDAWADI LETTER GHA		MAHAJANI LETTER GHA		MULTANI LETTER GHA	
Encodings	decimal	hex	dec	hex	dec	hex	dec	hex	dec	hex	dec	hex
Unicode	71309	U+1168D	71693	U+1180D	70156	U+1120C	70334	U+112BE	69976	U+11158	70280	U+11288
UTF-8	240 145 154 141	F0 91 9A 8D	240 145 160 141	F0 91 A0 8D	240 145 136 140	F0 91 88 8C	240 145 138 190	F0 91 8A BE	240 145 133 152	F0 91 85 98	240 145 138 136	F0 91 8A 88
UTF-16	55301 56973	D805 DE8D	55302 56333	D806 DC0D	55300 56844	D804 DE0C	55300 57022	D804 DEBE	55300 56664	D804 DD58	55300 56968	D804 DE88
Numeric character reference	&#71309;	&#x1168D;	&#71693;	&#x1180D;	&#70156;	&#x1120C;	&#70334;	&#x112BE;	&#69976;	&#x11158;	&#70280;	&#x11288;

Character information
Preview	ᬖ		ꦓ	
Unicode name	BALINESE LETTER GA GORA		JAVANESE LETTER GA MURDA	
Encodings	decimal	hex	dec	hex
Unicode	6934	U+1B16	43411	U+A993
UTF-8	225 172 150	E1 AC 96	234 166 147	EA A6 93
Numeric character reference	&#6934;	&#x1B16;	&#43411;	&#xA993;

Character information
Preview	𑴏	
Unicode name	MASARAM GONDI LETTER GHA	
Encodings	decimal	hex
Unicode	72975	U+11D0F
UTF-8	240 145 180 143	F0 91 B4 8F
UTF-16	55303 56591	D807 DD0F
Numeric character reference	&#72975;	&#x11D0F;

== See also ==
- Heth
