= Nicolas Vilant =

Scottish mathematician (1737–1807)

- Born: 12 June 1737; Ferryport-on-Tay, today Tayport, Scotland
- Died: 27 May 1807 (aged 70); Saint Andrews, Scotland
- Education: University of St Andrews
- Known for: Text books
- Scientific career
- Fields: Mathematics
- Workplaces: University of St Andrews

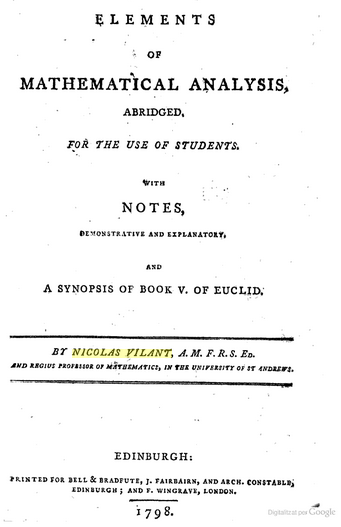
Front page of Elements (1798 edition)

Nicolas Vilant FRSE (1737–1807) was a mathematician from Scotland in the 18th century, known for his textbooks. He was a joint founder of the Royal Society of Edinburgh in 1783.

== Life ==
He was baptised in Ferryport-on-Tay (now called Tayport) on 12 June 1737, the son of Rev William Vilant, the local minister (but of French descent), and his second wife, Jean Wilson. He studied mathematics at St Andrews University from 1752 under Prof David Gregory.

Vilant was Regius Professor of Mathematics in the University of Saint Andrews from 1765 to his death in 1807. Often ill, he was unable to teach most of this time, and lectures were given by assistants, among them John West. Under Newtonian tradition, he was unable to follow the continental developments in mathematical analysis, like most of his British contemporaries.

He died in St Andrews on 25 May 1807.

== Family ==
He married Elizabeth Brand around 1770. Two of their sons attended St Andrews University.

== Publications ==
He was a good mathematician, and his textbooks were very popular until the first years of the 19th century. The most renowned was The Elements of Mathematical Analysis, Abridged for the Use of Students, first printed in 1777 and used as a university textbook from 1783, reprinted for student use.

There are many manuscripts conserved in the archives of the University of Saint Andrews.

== Bibliography ==
- Craik, Alex D.D. (2012). "A forgotten British analyst: Nicolas Vilant (1737–1807)". Historia Mathematica. 39 (2): 174–206. doi:10.1016/j.hm.2011.10.002. ISSN 0315-0860.
- Mann, A.J.S.; Craik, A.D.D. (2011). "Scotland. Land of opportunity but few rewards". In Raymond Flood; Adrian Rice; Robin Wilson (eds.). Mathematics in Victorian Britain. Oxford University Press. pp. 77–102. ISBN 978-0-19-960139-4.
