= Regius Professor of Mathematics =

Professorship given to chairs in mathematics in British universities

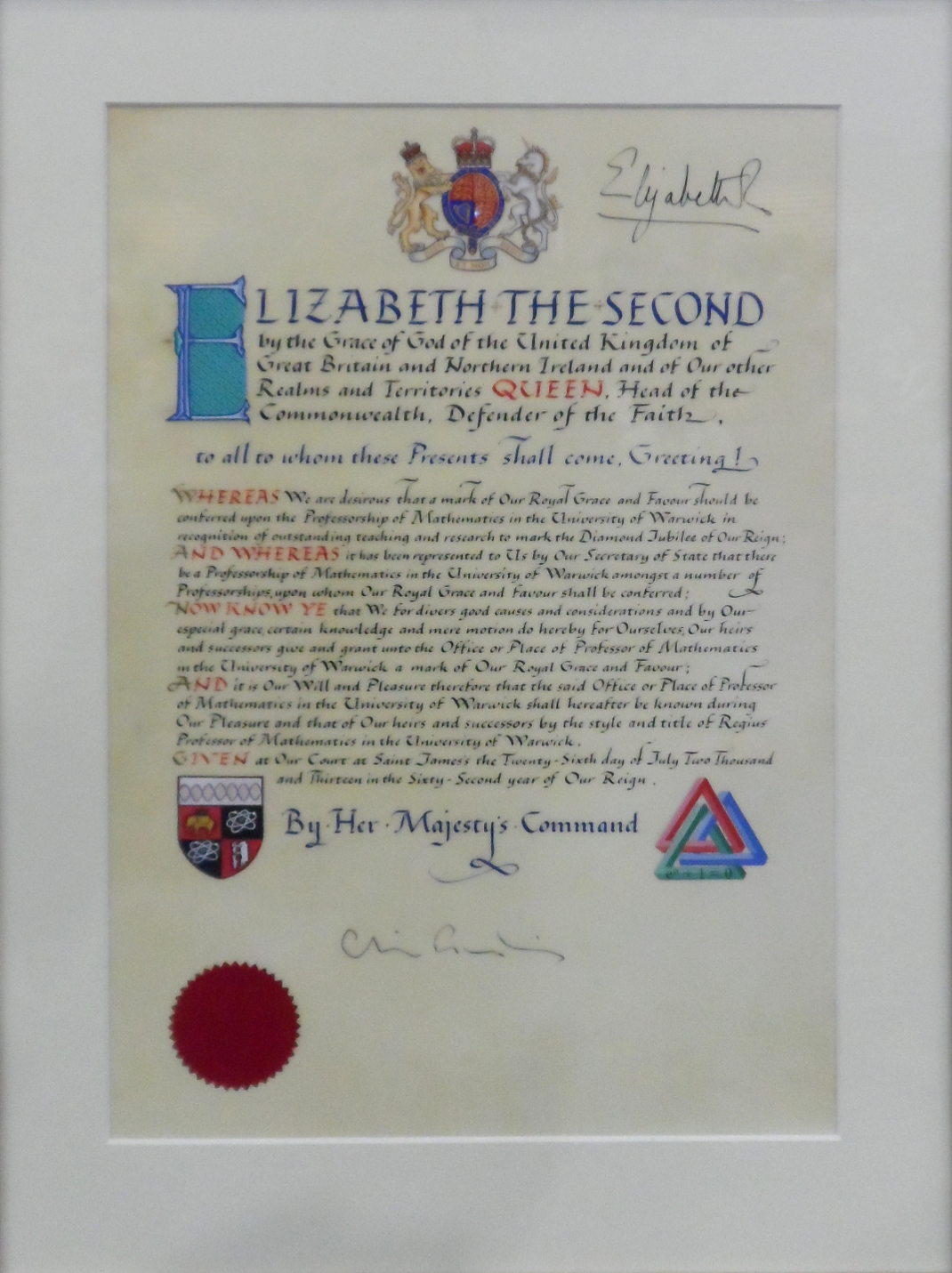
Royal warrant creating a Regius Chair in Mathematics at the University of Warwick

The Regius Professorship of Mathematics is the name given to three chairs in mathematics at British universities, one at the University of St Andrews, founded by Charles II in 1668, the second one at the University of Warwick, founded in 2013 to commemorate the Diamond Jubilee of Elizabeth II and the third one at the University of Oxford, founded in 2016.

== University of St Andrews (1668) ==
From 1997 to 2015 there was no Regius Professor of Mathematics. In April 2013 the post was advertised, and in 2015 Igor Rivin was appointed. He was succeeded by Kenneth Falconer in 2017.

=== List of Regius Professors of Mathematics ===
The following list may be incomplete.

- 1668–1674 James Gregory
- 1674–1688 William Sanders
- 1689–1690 James Fenton
- 1690–1707 vacant
- 1707–1739 Charles Gregory
- 1739–1765 David Gregory
- 1765–1807 Nicolas Vilant
- 1807–1809 vacant
- 1809–1820 Robert Haldane
- 1820–1858 Thomas Duncan
- 1857–1858 John Couch Adams
- 1859–1877 William L F Fischer
- 1877–1879 George Chrystal
- 1879–1921 Peter Redford Scott Lang
- 1921–1950 Herbert Westren Turnbull
- 1950–1969 Edward Thomas Copson
- 1970–1997 John Mackintosh Howie
- 1997–2015 vacant
- 2015–2017 Igor Rivin
- 2017–present Kenneth Falconer

== University of Warwick (2013) ==
The creation of the post of the Regius Professor of Mathematics was announced in January 2013, in March 2014 Martin Hairer was appointed to the position. Tim Austin was appointed in July 2023, following Hairer's move to Imperial College, London in 2017.

== University of Oxford (2016) ==
The creation of the post of the Regius Professor of Mathematics was announced in June 2016 and Andrew Wiles was appointed as the first holder of the chair in May 2018. In August 2020, it was confirmed that the Regius Professorship in Mathematics at the University of Oxford would be permanently associated with Merton College.

In July 2026, it was announced that the King had approved the appointment of James Maynard as the new Regius Professor of Mathematics, to succeed Wiles on 1 October 2026.
