= John West (mathematician) =

Scottish mathematician (1756–1817)

- Born: 10 April 1756; Logie, Fife, Scotland
- Died: 17 October 1817 (aged 61); Morant Bay, Jamaica
- Education: University of St Andrews
- Scientific career
- Fields: Mathematics
- Workplaces: University of St Andrews

John West (1756-1817) was a mathematician and priest from Scotland.

== Life and work ==
Fourth child of Samuel West and Margaret Mein, his father died in 1766. West matriculated in the University of Saint Andrews in 1769 thanks to financial help of the presbytery clerk Dr. Adamson. He, like his brothers, studied mathematics under professor Nicolas Vilant.

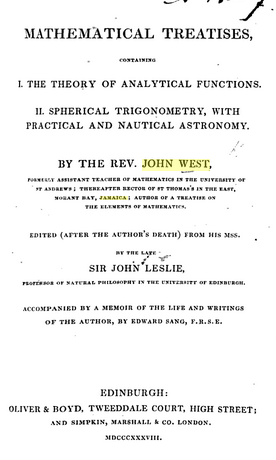
Frontpage of Treatises (1838)

He was assistant of professor Vilant, who had poor health, but lacking of prospects in his native land, he emigrated to Jamaica, in 1784, the same year that Elements of Mathematics and A System of Shorthand were published.

In Jamaica, West was initially teacher in the Manning's Free School at Savanna-la-Mar in Westmoreland Parish.

In 1790 he was appointed rector of Saint Thomas in Morant Bay, where he died in 1817.

During his life in Jamaica he never left his mathematical studies, despite his academic isolation.

Before his death, he sent the manuscript of Mathematical Treatises to his old student John Leslie, who published it in 1838.

== Bibliography ==
- Craik, Alex D.D. (1998). "Geometry, Analysis, and the Baptism of Slaves: John West in Scotland and Jamaica". Historia Mathematica. 25 (1): 29–74. doi:10.1006/hmat.1997.2174. ISSN 0315-0860.
- Mann, A.J.S.; Craik, A.D.D. (2011). "Scotland. Land of opportunity but few rewards". In Raymond Flood; Adrian Rice; Robin Wilson (eds.). Mathematics in Victorian Britain. Oxford University Press. pp. 77–102. ISBN 978-0-19-960139-4.
