= Alexander Roberts =

Scottish biblical scholar

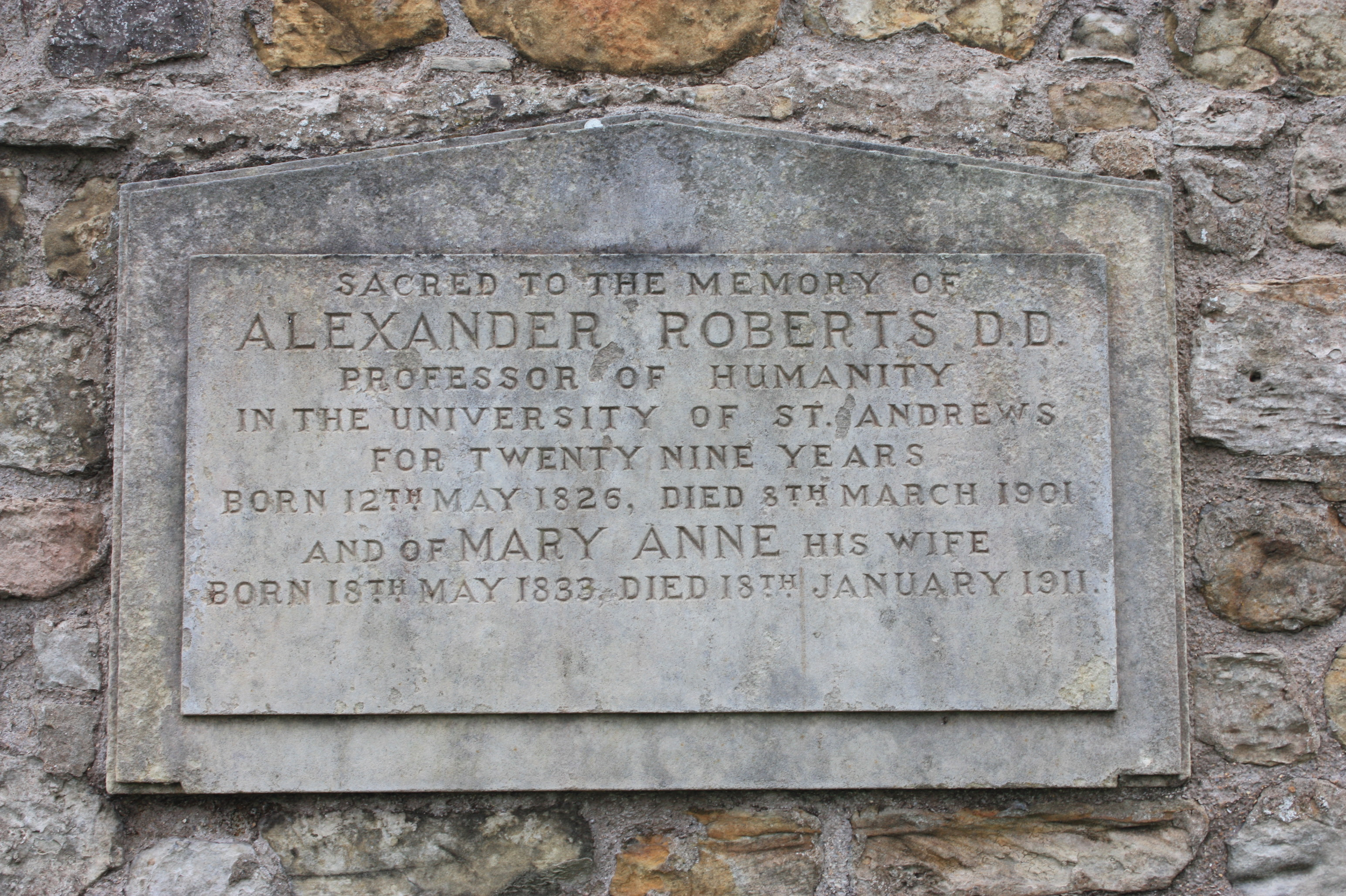
The grave of Roberts, St Andrews Cathedral churchyard

Alexander Roberts (12 May 1826 – 8 March 1901) was a 19th-century Scottish biblical scholar.

== Life ==
Born at Marykirk, Kincardineshire, on 12 May 1826, he was the son of Alexander Roberts, a flax-spinner, and his wife, Helen Stuart. He was educated at the grammar school and King's College, Aberdeen, where he graduated MA in March 1847, being the Simpson Greek prizeman. From 1849 to 1851 he trained as a minister of the Free Church of Scotland at New College, Edinburgh.

Roberts was minister of the Free Church in Stonehaven from 1852 to 1857. In 1857 he was translated to the Free Scots Church in Carlton Hill in London. In 1864 he was awarded an honorary doctorate, Doctor of Divinity by Edinburgh University. He was also minister at St. John's Wood, and was a member of the New Testament revision company (1870–84). In 1871, he succeeded John Campbell Shairp as Professor of Humanity at the University of St. Andrews.

He was made emeritus professor on his retirement in 1899. He died at Mitcham Park, Surrey, on 8 March 1901. He was returned to St Andrews for burial and lies in the south-east corner of the churchyard of St Andrews Cathedral.

== Family ==
On 2 December 1852 he married Mary Anne Speid of Melgund (died 18 January 1911), and had fourteen children, of whom four sons and eight daughters survived him.

Of note, his daughter Margaret Spinks Roberts married George Samuel Newth, Principal of New College, London.

== Works ==
Roberts' "Discussions on the Gospels" was published in 1862, one of a series of works in which he maintained that Greek was the habitual speech of Jesus, a conclusion unpopular at the time. He co-operated with Sir James Donaldson as editor and part translator of the English versions of ecclesiastical writers published as the Ante-Nicene Christian Library (T. & T. Clark, 1867–72, 24 vols.), the first major edition in English of these Church Fathers. He also translated the Works of Sulpitius Severus (1895) in the Select Library of Nicene and Post-Nicene Fathers.

Roberts also wrote, Companion to the Revised Version of the New Testament Explaining the Reasons for the Changes Made on the Authorized Version (1881)
