= John Barclay Tait =

British hydrographist

John Barclay Tait FRSE
- Born: June 7, 1900; Edinburgh, Scotland
- Died: March 20, 1973; Macbieknowe, near West Linton, Peeblesshire, Scotland
- Education: Heriot-Watt College
- Occupation: Hydrographist
- Employer: Fishery Board for Scotland
- Known for: Hydrography of the North Sea and Faroe–Shetland Channel
- Awards: Fellow of the Royal Society of Edinburgh (1933); Keith Medal (1957–1959)

Dr John Barclay Tait FRSE (1900–1973) was a 20th-century British hydrographist. From 1962 to 1965 he was deputy director of the Marine Laboratory in Aberdeen linked to the Fishery Board for Scotland. He was an expert in the hydrography of the North Sea and of the Faroe Shetland Channel.

== Life ==
He was born in Edinburgh on 7 June 1900.

He studied Science at Heriot-Watt College graduating BSc in 1922 and followed this with a doctorate (PhD). In 1925 he began work as a hydrographer in the Marine Laboratory in Aberdeen.

In 1928 he was appointed a Junior Naturalist to the Fishery Board of Scotland alongside Sydney Guy Gibbons.

In 1933 he was elected a Fellow of the Royal Society of Edinburgh. His proposers were Alexander Bowman, Alan Grant Ogilvie, James Ritchie and Sir D'Arcy Wentworth Thompson. He won the Society's Keith Medal for the period 1957–1959.

He retired in 1965 and died at Macbieknowe near West Linton in Peeblesshire on 20 March 1973.

== Publications ==
- Hydrography in Relation to Fisheries (1938)
