= Alexander Smith (chemist) =

Scottish chemist

Professor Alexander Smith FRSE
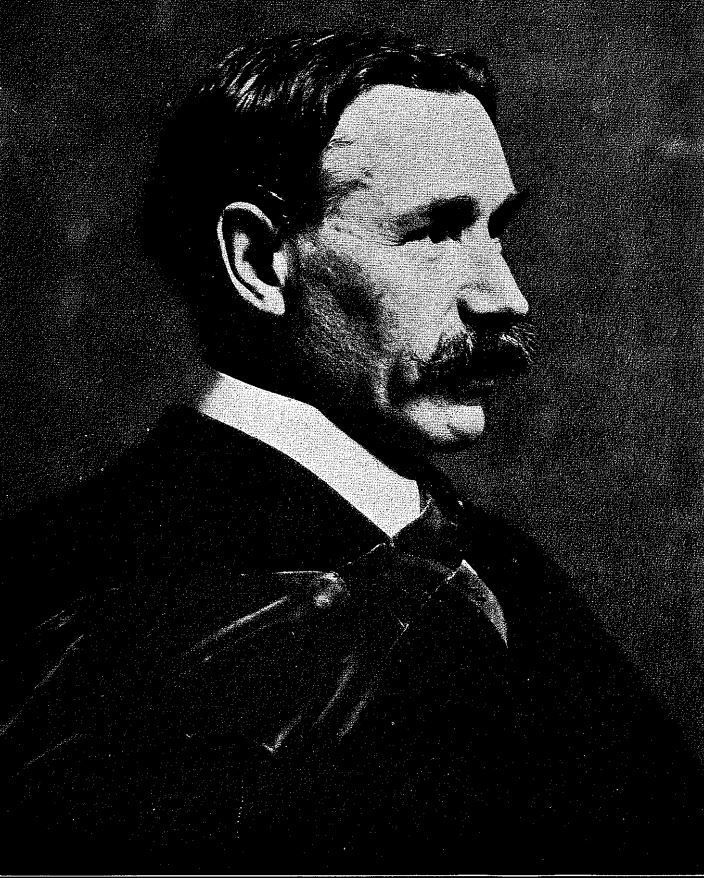
- Born: 11 September 1865 (United Kingdom) Edinburgh, Scotland, UK
- Died: 8 September 1922 (aged 56) (United Kingdom) Edinburgh, Scotland, UK
- Education: Edinburgh Collegiate School; University of Edinburgh; Ludwig-Maximilians-Universität München
- Spouse: Sarah Bowles (married 1905)
- Children: William Bowles Smith; Isabella Carter Smith
- Awards: Keith Medal
- Scientific career
- Fields: Chemistry
- Workplaces: University of Edinburgh; Wabash College; University of Chicago; Columbia University

Alexander Smith (11 September 1865 – 8 September 1922) was a Scottish chemist, who spent his working life teaching in the universities of America.

== Biography ==
He was born at 4 Nelson Street in Edinburgh's New Town, the son of Isabella (née Carter) and Alexander W. Smith, a music teacher. His paternal grandfather was the sculptor Alexander Smith. The family moved to 4 West Castle Road in the Merchiston district while he was young.

He was educated at Edinburgh Collegiate School. He studied sciences (later specialising in chemistry) at the University of Edinburgh. He was taught mathematics by George Chrystal, physics by Peter Guthrie Tait and chemistry by Alexander Crum Brown. He obtained his B.Sc. in 1886 at the University of Edinburgh. During his university years, he showed a keen interest in astronomy and published four papers on the subject. He went to Germany in 1886 for further postgraduate studies and gained his doctorate at the Ludwig-Maximilians-Universität München under Prof Rainer Ludwig Claisen in Baeyer's laboratory in 1889.

In 1890, aged 25, he was elected a Fellow of the Royal Society of Edinburgh. His proposers were Alexander Crum Brown, John Gibson, Leonard Dobbin and Ralph Stockman. In 1911, the Society awarded him its Keith Medal for the period 1909–1911. In 1910 and 1911 he published, with coauthor Alan W. C. Menzies, important experimental research on vapor pressures.

After moving to the United States, Smith was professor of chemistry and mineralogy at Wabash College (1890–1894) and later a faculty member at the University of Chicago (1895–1911). His former student James Bert Garner at Wabash College went on to invent the gas mask. In 1911, he was called to Columbia University to be professor and head of the department of chemistry, and in the same year he held the presidency of the American Chemical Society. He was elected to the National Academy of Sciences in 1915.

In 1919, the University of Edinburgh awarded him an honorary doctorate (LLD).

He retired due to ill-health in 1921 and returned home to Edinburgh, where he died on 8 September 1922.

== Family ==
In 1905, he married Sarah Ludden, a widow (née Sarah Bowles) from Memphis, Tennessee. They had one son, William Bowles Smith, and one daughter, Isabella Carter Smith.

== Publications ==
- Asteroids and Their Origin (1885)
- Laboratory Outline of General Chemistry (1899)
- The Teaching of Chemistry and Physics (1902), with Prof. E. H. Hall
- Introduction to General Inorganic Chemistry (1906; second edition, 1912)
- General Chemistry for Colleges (1908; revised edition, 1916)
- A Text-Book of Elementary Chemistry (1914)
