= Keith Medal =

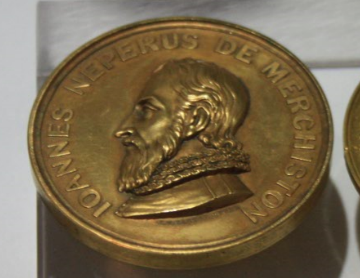
Lord Kelvin's Keith medal in the Hunterian Museum, Glasgow

The Keith Medal was a prize awarded by the Royal Society of Edinburgh, Scotland's national academy, for a scientific paper published in the society's scientific journals, preference being given to a paper containing a discovery, either in mathematics or earth sciences.

The Medal was inaugurated in 1827 as a result of a gift from Alexander Keith of Dunnottar, the first Treasurer of the Society. It was awarded quadrennially, alternately for a paper published in: Proceedings A (Mathematics) or Transactions (Earth and Environmental Sciences). The medal bears the head of John Napier of Merchiston.

The medal is no longer awarded.

== Recipients of the Keith Gold Medal ==
Source (1827 to 1913): Proceedings of the Royal Society of Edinburgh

19th century

- 1827–29: David Brewster, on his Discovery of Two New Immiscible Fluids in the Cavities of certain Minerals
- 1829–31: David Brewster, on a New Analysis of Solar Light
- 1831–33: Thomas Graham, on the Law of the Diffusion of Gases
- 1833–35: James David Forbes, on the Refraction and Polarization of Heat
- 1835–37: John Scott Russell, on Hydrodynamics
- 1837–39: John Shaw, on the Development and Growth of the Salmon
- 1839–41: Not awarded
- 1841–43: James David Forbes, on Glaciers
- 1843–45: Not awarded
- 1845–47: Sir Thomas Brisbane, for the Makerstoun Observations on Magnetic Phenomena
- 1847–49: Not awarded
- 1849–51: Philip Kelland, on General Differentiation, including his more recent Communication on a process of the Differential Calculus, and its application to the solution of certain Differential Equations
- 1851–53: William John Macquorn Rankine, on the Mechanical Action of Heat
- 1853–55: Thomas Anderson, on the Crystalline Constituents of Opium, and on the Products of the Destructive Distillation of Animal Substances
- 1855–57: George Boole, on the Application of the Theory of Probabilities to Questions of the Combination of Testimonies and Judgments
- 1857–59: Not awarded
- 1859–61: John Allan Broun, on the Horizontal Force of the Earth’s Magnetism, on the Correction of the Bifilar Magnetometer, and on Terrestrial Magnetism generally
- 1861–63: William Thomson, on some Kinematical and Dynamical Theorems
- 1863–65: James David Forbes, for Experimental Inquiry into the Laws of Conduction of Heat in Iron Bars
- 1865–67: Charles Piazzi Smyth, on Recent Measures at the Great Pyramid
- 1867–69: Peter Guthrie Tait, on the Rotation of a Rigid Body about a Fixed Point
- 1869–71: James Clerk Maxwell, on Figures, Frames, and Diagrams of Forces
- 1871–73: Peter Guthrie Tait, First Approximation to a Thermo-electric Diagram
- 1873–75: Alexander Crum Brown, on the Sense of Rotation, and on the Anatomical Relations of the Semicircular Canals of the Internal Ear
- 1875–77: Matthew Forster Heddle, on the Rhombohedral Carbonates and on the Felspars of Scotland
- 1877–79: Henry Charles Fleeming Jenkin, on the Application of Graphic Methods to the Determination of the Efficiency of Machinery
- 1879–81: George Chrystal, on the Differential Telephone
- 1881–83: Sir Thomas Muir, Researches into the Theory of Determinants and Continued Fractions
- 1883–85: John Aitken, on the Formation of Small Clear Spaces in Dusty Air
- 1885–87: John Young Buchanan, for a series of communications, extending over several years, on subjects connected with Ocean Circulation, Compressibility of Glass, etc.
- 1887–89: Edmund Albert Letts, for his papers on the Organic Compounds of Phosphorus
- 1889–91: Robert Traill Omond, for his contributions to Meteorological Science
- 1891–93: Sir Thomas Richard Fraser, for his papers on Strophanthus hispidus, Strophanthin, and Strophanthidin
- 1893–95: Cargill Gilston Knott, for his papers on the Strains produced by Magnetism in Iron and in Nickel
- 1895–97: Sir Thomas Muir, for his continued communications on Determinants and Allied Questions
- 1897–99: James Burgess, on the Definite Integral ...

20th/21st century

- 1899–1901: Hugh Marshall, for his discovery of the Persulphates, and for his Communications on the Properties and Reactions of these Salts
- 1901–03: Sir William Turner, for A Contribution to the Craniology of the People of Scotland and Contributions to the Craniology of the People of the Empire of India
- 1903–05: Thomas Hastie Bryce, for his two papers on The Histology of the Blood of the Larva of Lepidosiren paradoxa
- 1905–07: Alexander Bruce, on the Distribution of the Cells in the Intermedio-Lateral Tract of the Spinal Cord
- 1907–09: Wheelton Hind, On the Lamellibranch and Gasteropod Fauna found in the Millstone Grit of Scotland
- 1909–11: Alexander Smith, for his researches upon Sulphur and upon Vapour Pressure
- 1911–13: James Russell, for his series of investigations relating to magnetic phenomena in metals and the molecular theory of magnetism
- 1913–15: James Hartley Ashworth
- 1915–17: Robert Cockburn Mossmann
- 1917–19: John Stephenson
- 1919–21: Ralph Allan Sampson
- 1921–23: John Walter Gregory
- 1923–25: Herbert Westren Turnbull
- 1925–27: Robert Meldrum Craig jointly with ?
- 1927–29: Christina Miller
- 1929–31: Alan William Greenwood
- 1931–33: Arthur Crichton Mitchell, for his work on geomagnetism
- 1933–35: Lancelot Thomas Hogben
- 1935–37: Harold Stanley Ruse
- 1937–39: Francis Albert Eley Crew
- 1939–41: Sir William Hunter McCrea jointly with Edward Copson
- 1941–43: James Ritchie
- 1943–45: William Leonard Edge
- 1945–47: Charlotte Auerbach
- 1947–49: Arthur Geoffrey Walker
- 1949–51: Alastair Graham
- 1951–53: Daniel Edwin Rutherford
- 1953–55: Alexander David Peacock
- 1955–57: Ivor Malcolm Haddon Etherington
- 1957–59: John Barclay Tait
- 1959–61:
- 1961–63: Robert Alexander Rankin
- 1963–65: Reinhold Henry Furth
- 1965–67: Alexander John Haddow
- 1967–69: Henry Jack
- 1969–71: Charles Dewar Waterston
- 1971–73: Douglas Samuel Jones
- 1973–75: Kenneth Lyon Blaxter
- 1975–77: Michael Stephen Patrick Eastham
- 1977–79: Brian John Bluck
- 1979–81: John Mackintosh Howie
- 1981–83: John Heslop-Harrison
- 1983–85: John Bryce McLeod
- 1985–87:
- 1987–89: John Macleod Ball
- 1989–91:
- 1991–93:
- 1993–95: Euan Clarkson (78th award)
- 1995–97: No award
- 1997–99: Vladimír Šverák (79th award)
- 1999–2001:
- 2001–03: No award
- 2005: No award
- 2006: Antonio DeSimone, Stefan Müller, Robert Kohn, Felix Otto
- Medal no longer awarded (though a 2011 edition had been planned)

== See also ==
- List of mathematics awards
