= E. A. Letts =

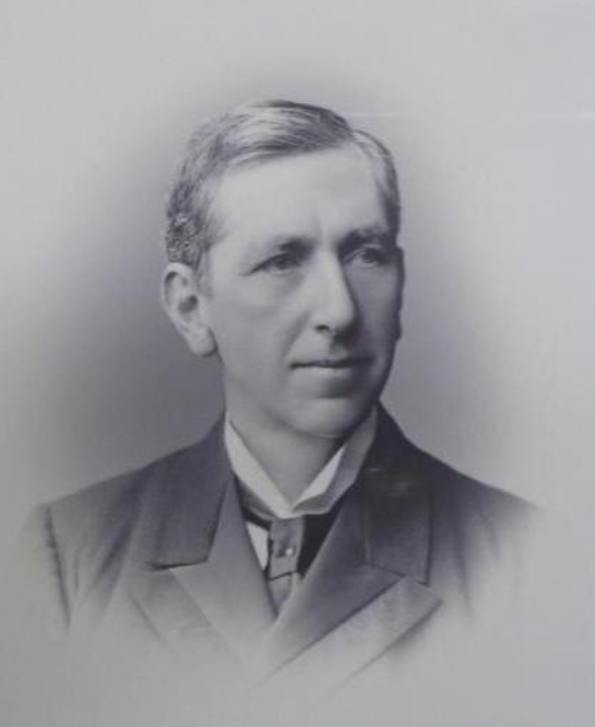
E A Letts

Professor Edmund Albert Letts FRSE FCS FIC (27 August 1852 – 19 February 1918) was a 19th-century English chemist. He was a pioneer of analytical chemistry. The Letts Nitrile Synthesis is named after him. He spent much time analysing the content of carbon dioxide in air and water and the latter part of his life looked at pollution in tidal waters. Queens University Belfast give a Letts Chemical Research Scholarship in his memory.

== Life ==
He was born at Clare Lodge in Sydenham in Kent on 27 August 1852 the son of Emma Harwood Barrie and her husband, Thomas Letts. He was educated at Bishop's Stortford School in Hertfordshire. He studied science at King's College, London then undertook postgraduate studies at both Berlin and Vienna.

Aged 20 he became Chief Assistant in the Chemistry Department of the University of Edinburgh. In 1876 he became the first Professor of Chemistry at University College, Bristol, aged 24. Only three years later he transferred to Northern Ireland to be Professor of Chemistry at Queens College, Belfast where he then remained for 38 years.

In 1874 he was elected a Fellow of the Royal Society of Edinburgh. His proposers were Alexander Crum Brown, Joseph Lister, Peter Guthrie Tait and Sir James Dewar. He won the Society's Keith Prize for the period 1887–89.

He retired to South View on the Isle of Wight, his father's holiday home, in 1917.

He was killed in a cycling accident on the Isle of Wight on 19 February 1918.

== Publications ==
- Qualitative Analysis Tables (1892)
- Some Fundamental Problems of Chemistry, Old and New (1914)
