= Bitensor =

Tensorial object depending on two points in a manifold

In differential geometry and general relativity, a bitensor (or bi-tensor) is a tensorial object that depends on two points in a manifold, as opposed to ordinary tensors which depend on a single point. Bitensors provide a framework for describing relationships between different points in spacetime and are used in the study of various phenomena in curved spacetime.

== Definition ==
A bitensor is a tensorial object that depends on two points in a manifold, rather than on a single point as ordinary tensors do. A bitensor field $B$ can be formally defined as a map from the product manifold to an appropriate vector space $B: M \times M \to V$, where $M$ is a smooth manifold and $V$ is the vector space corresponding to the tensor space being considered.

In the language of fiber bundles, a bitensor of type $(r,s,r',s')$ is defined as a section of the exterior tensor product bundle $T^r_s M \boxtimes T^{r'}_{s'} M$, where $T^r_s M$ denotes the tensor bundle of rank $(r,s)$ and $\boxtimes$ represents the exterior tensor product $B \in \Gamma(T^r_s M \boxtimes T^{r'}_{s'} M)$, where $\Gamma$ denotes the space of sections.

The exterior tensor product bundle is constructed as $\mathcal{V}_1 \boxtimes \mathcal{V}_2 = \mathrm{pr}_1^* \mathcal{V}_1 \otimes \mathrm{pr}_2^* \mathcal{V}_2$ where $\mathrm{pr}_i$ are projection operators that project onto the respective factors of the product manifold $M \times M$, and $\mathrm{pr}_i^*$ denotes the pullback of the respective bundles.

In coordinate notation, a bitensor $T$ with components $T^{\mu\nu'\ldots}_{\alpha\beta'\ldots}(x,y)$ has indices associated with two different points $x$ and $y$ in the manifold. By convention, unprimed indices (such as $\mu$, $\alpha$) refer to the first point, while primed indices (such as $\nu'$, $\beta'$) refer to the second point. The simplest example of a bitensor is a biscalar field, which is a scalar function of two points. Applications include parallel transport, heat kernels, and various Green's functions employed in quantum field theory in curved spacetime.

== History ==
The concept of bitensors was first formally developed by mathematician Harold Stanley Ruse in his 1931 paper An Absolute Partial Differential Calculus, published in the Quarterly Journal of Mathematics. Ruse introduced bitensors as a generalization of tensor calculus to functions of two sets of variables.

== See also ==
- Propagator
- Riemann curvature tensor
- Stokes flow
- Synge's world function
