= Alexander Keith of Dunnottar =

Scottish landowner, lawyer and reformer

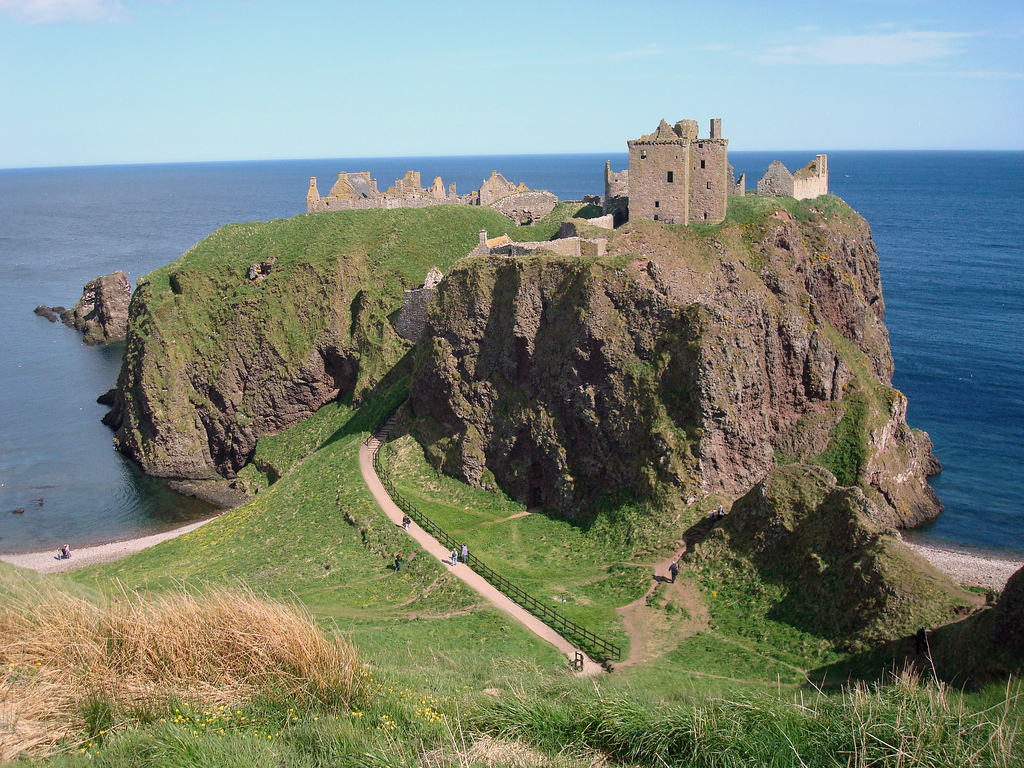
Dunnottar Castle

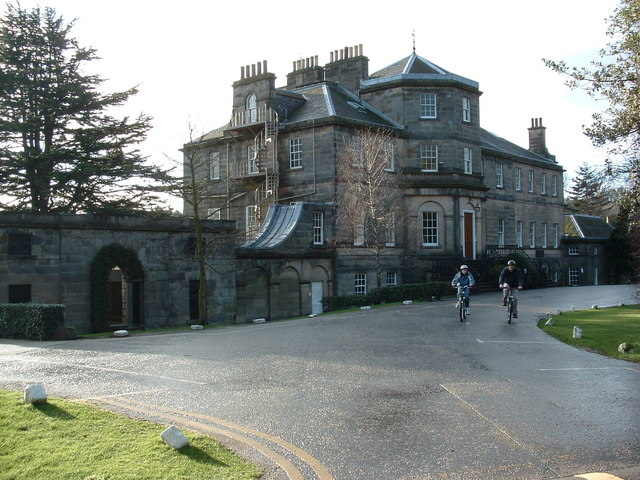
Ravelston House

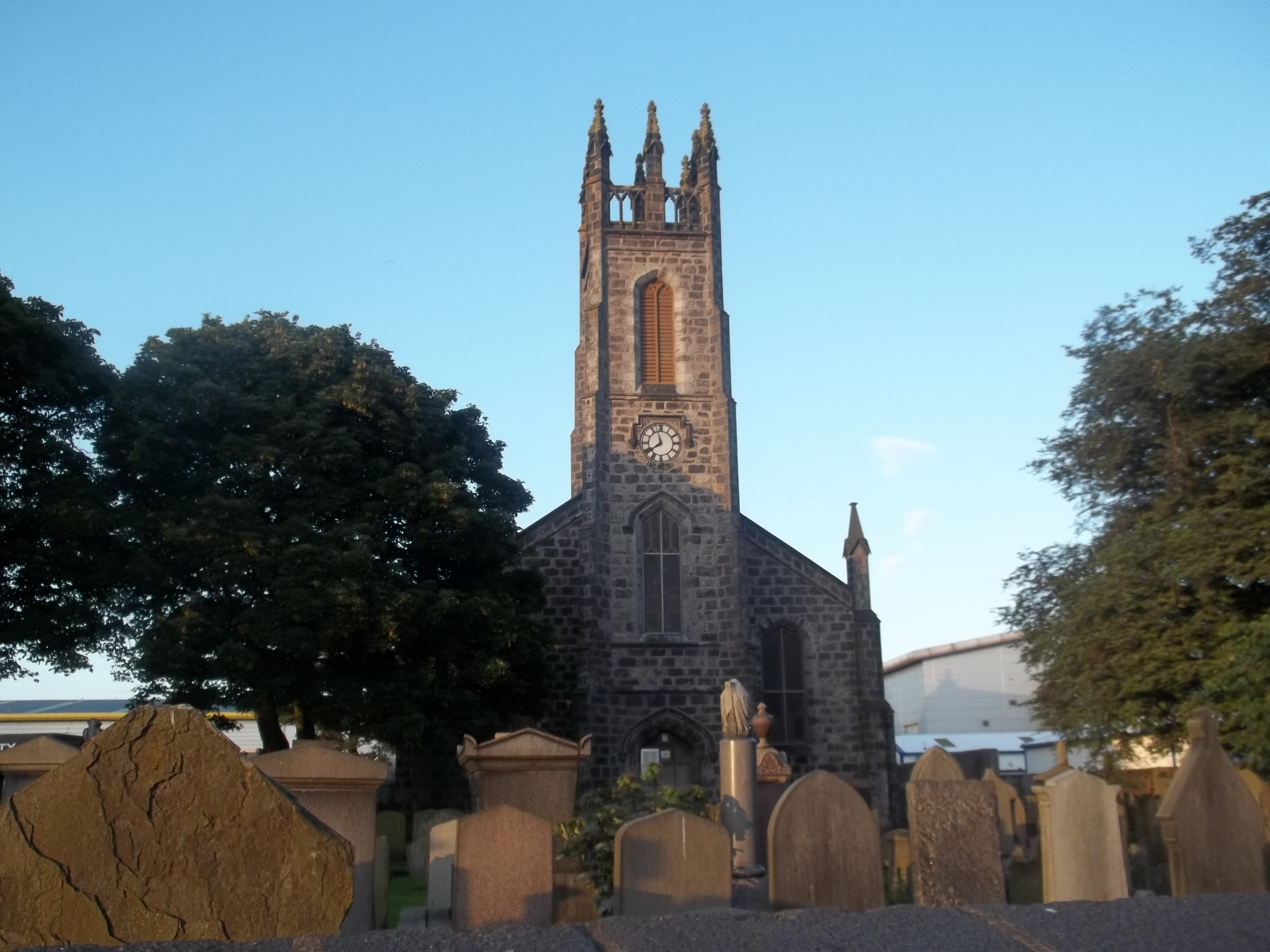
St Clements churchyard

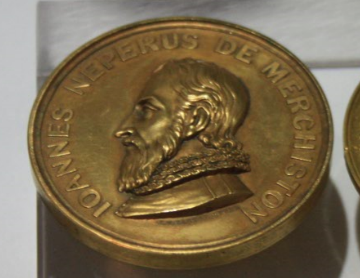
The Keith Medal

Sir Alexander Keith of Dunnottar and Ravelston WS FSA Scot FRSE (1736–1819) was an 18th and 19th century Scottish landowner, lawyer and reformer. He was a co-founder of the Royal Society of Edinburgh, and its Keith Medal is named in his honour.

== Life ==
He was born on 30 September 1736.

He was the eldest son of Johanna (née Swinton) and Alexander Keith of Ravelston and Dunnottar (1705-1792), Depute Clerk of Session. The family owned both Dunnottar Castle in northern Scotland and Ravelston House, just west of Edinburgh (fragments of which survive and are called Old Ravelston House). His grandfather, also Alexander Keith, had acquired the latter estate from John Foulis of Ravelston via Archibald Primrose of Dunipace in 1726. The Dunnotar estate was purchased in 1766.

He was apprenticed as a lawyer in Edinburgh, first to Hew Crawford then to John MacKenzie, the latter having offices at Horse Wynd off the Royal Mile.

He qualified as a Writer to the Signet in 1763 then became Clerk to the Signet.

In 1783 he was a founding fellow of the Royal Society of Edinburgh. He served as the Society's first treasurer and continued this role until 1798.

Around 1790 Alexander Keith of Dunnottar built a new mansionhouse at Ravelston in the Adam-style.

His offices were at 43 Queen Street in Edinburgh's New Town.

He died at Dunnottar Castle on 26 February 1819 and is buried in St Clement's Churchyard in Aberdeen. A family memorial also exists on the west gable of Greyfriars Kirk in Edinburgh.

Following his death he left £600 to the Royal Society of Edinburgh to establish the Keith Medal, awarded every two years to a prominent mathematician or scientist within the Society.

== Family ==
Keith was married to Christian Forbes. Their eldest son (1768–1832) Alexander was also known as Sir Alexander Keith of Dunnottar. He was created a baronet during the visit of George IV to Scotland in 1822. He is buried in Greyfriars Kirkyard.
