= Igor Rivin =

Russian-Canadian mathematician

- Born: 1961 (age 64–65); Moscow, USSR
- Education: Princeton University; University of Toronto
- Known for: Inscribable polyhedra
- Awards: Whitehead Prize (1998)
- Scientific career
- Fields: Mathematics, Computer Science, Materials Science
- Workplaces: University of St Andrews; Temple University; Caltech; University of Warwick; Institute for Advanced Study; Institut des Hautes Études Scientifiques
- Doctoral advisor: William Thurston
- Doctoral students: Michael Dobbins

Igor Rivin (born 1961 in Moscow, USSR) is a Russian-Canadian mathematician, working in various fields of pure and applied mathematics, computer science, and materials science. He was the Regius Professor of Mathematics at the University of St. Andrews from 2015 to 2017, and was the chief research officer at Cryptos Fund until 2019. He was the principal of a couple of small hedge funds, and later did research for Edgestream LP, in addition to his academic work.

== Career ==
He received his B.Sc. (Hon) in mathematics from the University of Toronto in 1981, and his Ph.D. in 1986 from Princeton University under the direction of William Thurston. Following his doctorate, Rivin directed development of QLISP and the Mathematica kernel, before returning to academia in 1992, where he held positions at the Institut des Hautes Études Scientifiques, the Institute for Advanced Study, the University of Melbourne, Warwick, and Caltech. Since 1999, Rivin has been professor of mathematics at Temple University. Between 2015 and 2017 he was Regius Professor of Mathematics at the University of St. Andrews.

== Major accomplishments ==
Rivin's PhD thesis and a series of extensions characterized hyperbolic 3-dimensional polyhedra in terms of their dihedral angles, resolving a long-standing open question of Jakob Steiner on the inscribable combinatorial types. These, and some related results in convex geometry, have been used in 3-manifold topology, theoretical physics, computational geometry, and the recently developed field of discrete differential geometry.

Rivin has also made advances in counting geodesics on surfaces, the study of generic elements of discrete subgroups of Lie groups, and in the theory of dynamical systems.

Rivin is also active in applied areas, having written large parts of the Mathematica 2.0 kernel, and he developed a database of hypothetical zeolites in collaboration with M. M. J. Treacy.

Rivin is a frequent contributor to MathOverflow.

Igor Rivin is the co-creator, with economist Carlo Scevola, of Cryptocurrencies Index 30 (CCi30), an index of the top 30 cryptocurrencies weighted by market capitalization. CCi30 is sometimes used by academic economists as a market index when comparing the cryptocurrency trading market as a whole with individual currencies.

== Honors ==
- First prize, Canadian Mathematical Olympiad, 1977
- Whitehead prize of the London Mathematical Society, 1998
- Advanced Research Fellowship of the EPSRC, 1998
- Lady Davis Fellowship at the Hebrew University, 2006
- Berlin Mathematical School professorship, 2011.
- Fellow of the American Mathematical Society, 2014.
