= George Samuel Newth =

English chemist (1851–1936)

George Samuel Newth (1851 – 1936) was an English chemist, best known for a series of popular chemistry books.

== Biography ==
Born in 1851, in Plymouth, England, Newth was the son of Dr. the Rev Samuel Newth (1821–1898), principal of New College London, a noted Biblical scholar, non-conformist and mathematician. Newth's address in 1871 was 25 Clifton Road, Marylebone when he lived with his parents. He lived with his wife Margaret in Ealing in 1891 and in 1901 they were living at Lyndhunt (or Lyndhurst) House, 222 Maldon Road, Croydon, Surrey. Newth was also resident in either Godstone or Wallington [at 'The Sheilings'] in Surrey between 1901–1910.

Newth was a student (1869–1871) and demonstrator/lecturer and later examiner in Chemistry at the Royal College of Science in London (now Imperial College) from 1871 to 1909. He worked with other noted chemists including Edward Frankland and William A. Tilden. He was also, in his youth, a keen cyclist and his name and details of a race (in London) from Finchley to Welwyn and back appear in a copy of a US cycle magazine.

A full and interesting account of this race is recorded in a New Zealand paper :

Newth was also an amateur keeper of honey bees after 1898 and letters from him and a photograph of his bee hives at his home(s) in Wallington and Godstone in Surrey appear in the British Bee Keepers Journal between 1901–1910. Other letters and replies to his communications can be accessed by searching on line .pdf copies of this journal with the term 'newth'.

Newth died in Hythe, Kent, England, in 1936. No photographs have yet surfaced of him, although photographs of his father Samuel Newth are known.

== Family ==
In 1888, he married Margaret Spinks Roberts (1860–1949) daughter of Rev Prof Alexander Roberts of St Andrews.

== Scientific work ==
Newth was the author of a number of popular books in chemistry, most notably Chemical Lecture Experiments [Reviewed in Nature 47, 97–98 (1 December 1892) and Inorganic Chemistry. He was elected a fellow of the Chemical Society in 1894.

Chemical Lecture Experiments (one of 5 books by Newth published by Longman, Green & Company of London, England) first appeared in 1892 and is a collection of chemistry lecture experiments all of which the author had tried for himself. This book is hard to find now outside of libraries. Several books of chemical lecture experiments were subsequently published by other authors. An identically titled work by American chemist Francis Gano Benedict (1870–1957), was first published in 1901 and acknowledges Newth's book. The final reprint of Newth's Chemical Lecture Experiments appeared in the late 1920s.

Newth's Inorganic Chemistry (the most popular and remembered of his 5 books) was first published in 1894 although the earliest copy in the British Library is 1896. It was revised and reprinted many times (with author updates to 1923 when Newth was 72), the final version appearing in 1940 four years after Newth had died and 46 years after its first publication in 1894. Old copies can be found for sale quite reasonably priced from internet book suppliers.

Newth also wrote A Manual of Chemical Analysis – Qualitative and Quantitative published in 1898 and Elementary Practical Chemistry first published about 1896 (earliest UK copy seen is 1904) which was for school chemistry classes. This book was titled Elementary Inorganic Chemistry when sold in the US. Smaller Chemical Analysis published in 1906 was his final book.

Newth's books were reviewed in a number of journals, including Science and The Lancet. The latter journal in February 1899 mentions that Newth was appointed an examiner in chemistry at the Royal College of Science.

Newth also had a number of scientific papers published (see Bibliography section).

An American chemist, George D. Timmons, had a book called Questions on Newth's Inorganic Chemistry published in 1912.

It has been reported of John D. R. Thomas, past president (1990) of the Royal Society of Chemistry that his interest in chemistry derived from his father’s 1913 edition of G. S. Newth’s Elementary Practical Chemistry – A Laboratory Manual for Use in Organized Science Schools.

A memoir of Herbert Marcus Powell (1906–1991) mentions a poem he wrote about chemicals ('The Chemists Dream') which included a reference to G S Newth.

Newth's books offer insight into late Victorian chemistry for schools and colleges; he was in many ways ahead of his time.

== Bibliography ==
- G. S. Newth, Elementary Inorganic Chemistry, Longmans, Green, and Co. (first published 1898).
- G. S. Newth, Smaller Chemical Analysis, Longmans, Green, and Co. (first published 1906)
- G. S. Newth, A Manual of Chemical Analysis: Qualitative and Quantitative, Longmans, Green, and Co. (1899)
- G. S. Newth, A Text-book of Inorganic Chemistry, Longmans, Green, and Co. (first published 1894)
- G. S. Newth, Chemical Lecture Experiments: Non-metallic Elements, Longmans, Green, and Co. (1922; first published in 1892)
- G. S. Newth: "An apparatus for showing experiments with ozone", Journal of the Chemical Society, Transactions 69, 1298–1299, Royal Society of Chemistry, 1896.
- G. S. Newth: "Notes on partially miscible aqueous inorganic liquids", J. Chem. Soc., Trans., 1900, 77, 775 – 778.
- G. S. Newth: "A New Laboratory Process for Preparing Hydrobromic Acid", Scientific American Supplement, No. 841, February 13, 1892.
- G. S. Newth: "A Lecture Experiment", Nature 49, 293 (25 January 1894)
- G. S. Newth: "A laboratory method for the preparation of ethylene" Jour. Chem. Soc., 1901, 79, p. 915
