= Tim Austin (mathematician) =

British mathematician

Timothy Derek Austin is a British mathematician known for his work in ergodic theory, probability, and related areas of analysis. He is currently the Regius Professor of Mathematics at the University of Warwick, a position to which he was appointed in 2023.

== Education ==
Austin received his B.A. in mathematics from Trinity College, University of Cambridge in 2005. He then completed the Certificate of Advanced Study in Mathematics (Part III of the Mathematical Tripos) at Trinity College in 2006, with distinction. He earned his Ph.D. in mathematics from the University of California, Los Angeles in 2010 under the supervision of Terence Tao. His dissertation was entitled Multiple recurrence and the structure of probability-preserving systems.

== Career ==
From 2010 to 2012, Austin was a visiting academic at Brown University while holding a Clay Research Fellowship (2010–2015). He then joined the Courant Institute of Mathematical Sciences at New York University, first as an assistant professor (2012–2014) and later as an associate professor (2015–2017). He moved to UCLA as an associate professor in 2017, becoming a full professor in 2019. In the same year he published his proof of a weak Pinsker conjecture, which had remained unsolved since the 1970s. In 2023, he was appointed Regius Professor of Mathematics at the University of Warwick.

He has also held visiting research positions at Microsoft Research (Redmond and New England).

== Research ==
Austin works in ergodic theory, harmonic analysis, additive combinatorics, metric geometry, high-dimensional probability, and rigorous statistical mechanics.

== Awards and honors ==
- Clay Research Fellowship (2010–2015)
- New Horizons in Mathematics Prize (2020)
- Michael Brin Prize in Dynamical Systems (2021)
- Ostrowski Prize (2021)
