= Edward Copson =

British mathematician

Edward Thomas Copson
- Born: 21 August 1901; Coventry, England
- Died: 16 February 1980 (aged 78); St Andrews, Scotland
- Known for: The theory of functions of a complex variable
- Scientific career
- Fields: mathematics

Edward Thomas Copson FRSE (21 August 1901 – 16 February 1980) was a British mathematician who contributed widely to the development of mathematics at the University of St Andrews, serving as Regius Professor of Mathematics amongst other positions.

== Life ==
He was born in Coventry, and was a pupil at King Henry VIII School, Coventry. He studied at St John's College, Oxford. He was appointed by E. T. Whittaker as a lecturer at the University of Edinburgh, where he was later awarded a DSc.

He married Beatrice, the elder daughter of E. T. Whittaker, and moved to the University of St Andrews where he was Regius Professor of Mathematics, and later dean of science, then Master of the United College. He was instrumental in the construction of the new Mathematics Institute building at the university.

He was elected a Fellow of the Royal Society of Edinburgh in 1924, his proposers being Sir Edmund Taylor Whittaker, Herbert Stanley Allen, Bevan Braithwaite Baker and A. Crichton Mitchell. He was awarded the Keith Medal by the Royal Society of Edinburgh in 1942 for his research in mathematics. He served as the Society's vice president from 1950 to 1953.

== Work ==
Copson's primary focus was in classical analysis, asymptotic expansions, differential and integral equations, and applications to problems in theoretical physics. His first book "The theory of functions of a complex variable" was published in 1935.

== Publications ==
- Copson, E. T., An Introduction to the Theory of Functions of A Complex Variable (1935)
- Baker, Bevan Braithwaite; Copson, E. T., "The Mathematical Theory of Huygens' Principle" (1939); 2nd edition 1950; 3rd edition 1987 with several reprints
- Copson, E. T., Asymptotic Expansions (1965); reprint 1976; 2nd edition 2004
- Copson, E. T., Metric Spaces (1968); reprint with corrections 1972; reprint 1979; pbk. reprint 1988
- Copson, E. T., Partial Differential Equations (1975)
