= Injective function =

Function that preserves distinctness

In mathematics, an injective function (also known as injection, or one-to-one function) is a function f that maps distinct elements of its domain to distinct elements of its codomain; that is, x_{1} ≠ x_{2} implies f(x_{1}) ≠ f(x_{2}) (equivalently by contraposition, f(x_{1}) = f(x_{2}) implies x_{1} = x_{2}). In other words, every element of the function's codomain is the image of at most one element of its domain. The term one-to-one function must not be confused with one-to-one correspondence that refers to bijective functions, which are functions such that each element in the codomain is an image of exactly one element in the domain.

A homomorphism between algebraic structures is a function that is compatible with the operations of the structures. For all common algebraic structures, and, in particular for vector spaces, an injective homomorphism is also called a monomorphism. However, in the more general context of category theory, the definition of a monomorphism differs from that of an injective homomorphism. This is thus a theorem that they are equivalent for algebraic structures; see Homomorphism § Monomorphism for more details.

A function $f$ that is not injective is sometimes called many-to-one.

== Definition ==
An injective function, which is not also surjective

Let $f$ be a function whose domain is a set $X$. The function $f$ is said to be injective provided that for all $a$ and $b$ in $X,$ if $f(a) = f(b)$, then $a = b$; that is, $f(a) = f(b)$ implies $a = b$. Equivalently, if $a \neq b$, then $f(a) \neq f(b)$ in the contrapositive statement.

Symbolically,
$$\forall a,b \in X, \;\; f(a)=f(b) \Rightarrow a=b,$$
which is logically equivalent to the contrapositive,
$$\forall a, b \in X, \;\; a \neq b \Rightarrow f(a) \neq f(b).$$
An injective function (or, more generally, a monomorphism) is often denoted by using the specialized arrows ↣ or ↪ (for example, $f:A\rightarrowtail B$ or $f:A\hookrightarrow B$), although some authors specifically reserve ↪ for an inclusion map.

== Examples ==
For visual examples, readers are directed to the gallery section.

- For any set $X$ and any subset $S \subseteq X$, the inclusion map $S \to X$ (which sends any element $s \in S$ to itself) is injective. In particular, the identity function $X \to X$ is always injective (and in fact bijective).
- If the domain of a function is the empty set, then the function is the empty function, which is injective.
- If the domain of a function has one element (that is, it is a singleton set), then the function is always injective.
- The function $f : \R \to \R$ defined by $f(x) = 2 x + 1$ is injective.
- The function $g : \R \to \R$ defined by $g(x) = x^2$ is not injective, because (for example) $g(1) = 1 = g(-1).$ However, if $g$ is redefined so that its domain is the non-negative real numbers [0, +∞), then $g$ is injective.
- The exponential function $\exp : \R \to \R$ defined by $\exp(x) = e^x$ is injective (but not surjective, as no real value maps to a negative number).
- The natural logarithm function $\ln : (0, \infty) \to \R$ defined by $x \mapsto \ln x$ is injective.
- The function $g : \R \to \R$ defined by $g(x) = x^n - x$ is not injective, since, for example, $g(0) = g(1) = 0$.

More generally, when $X$ and $Y$ are both the real line $\R$, then an injective function $f : \R \to \R$ is one whose graph is never intersected by any horizontal line more than once. This principle is referred to as the horizontal line test.

== Injections can be undone ==
Functions with left inverses are always injections. That is, given $f : X \to Y$, if there is a function $g : Y \to X$ such that for every $x \in X$, $g(f(x)) = x$, then $f$ is injective. The proof is that
$$f(a) = f(b) \rightarrow g(f(a))=g(f(b)) \rightarrow a = b.$$

In this case, $g$ is called a retraction of $f$. Conversely, $f$ is called a section of $g$. For example: $f:\R\rightarrow\R^2,x\mapsto(1,m)^\intercal x$ is retracted by $g:y\mapsto\frac{(1,m)}{1+m^2}y$.

Conversely, every injection $f$ with a non-empty domain has a left inverse $g$. It can be defined by choosing an element $a$ in the domain of $f$ and setting $g(y)$ to the unique element of the pre-image $f^{-1}[y]$ (if it is non-empty) or to $a$ (otherwise). (Note: Unlike the corresponding statement that every surjective function has a right inverse, this does not require the axiom of choice, as the existence of $a$ is implied by the non-emptiness of the domain. However, this statement may fail in less conventional mathematics such as constructive mathematics. In constructive mathematics, the inclusion $\{ 0, 1 \} \to \R$ of the two-element set in the reals cannot have a left inverse, as it would violate indecomposability, by giving a retraction of the real line to the set {0,1}.)

The left inverse $g$ is not necessarily an inverse of $f,$ because the composition in the other order, $f \circ g$, may differ from the identity on $Y$. In other words, an injective function can be "reversed" by a left inverse, but is not necessarily invertible, which requires that the function is bijective.

== Injections may be made invertible ==
In fact, to turn an injective function $f : X \to Y$ into a bijective (hence invertible) function, it suffices to replace its codomain $Y$ by its actual image $J = f(X).$ That is, let $g : X \to J$ such that $g(x) = f(x)$ for all $x \in X$; then $g$ is bijective. Indeed, $f$ can be factored as $\operatorname{In}_{J,Y} \circ g$, where $\operatorname{In}_{J,Y}$ is the inclusion function from $J$ into $Y$.

More generally, injective partial functions are called partial bijections.

== Other properties ==
The composition of two injective functions is injective.

- If $f$ and $g$ are both injective then $f \circ g$ is injective.
- If $g \circ f$ is injective, then $f$ is injective (but $g$ need not be).
- $f : X \to Y$ is injective if and only if, given any functions $g$, $h : W \to X$ whenever $f \circ g = f \circ h$, then $g = h$. In other words, injective functions are precisely the monomorphisms in the category Set of sets.
- If $f : X \to Y$ is injective and $A$ is a subset of $X$, then $f^{-1}(f(A)) = A$. Thus, $A$ can be recovered from its image $f(A)$.
- If $f : X \to Y$ is injective and $A$ and $B$ are both subsets of $X$, then $f(A \cap B) = f(A) \cap f(B)$.
- Every function $h : W \to Y$ can be decomposed as $h = f \circ g$ for a suitable injection $f$ and surjection $g$. This decomposition is unique up to isomorphism, and $f$ may be thought of as the inclusion function of the range $h(W)$ of $h$ as a subset of the codomain $Y$ of $h$.
- If $f : X \to Y$ is an injective function, then $Y$ has at least as many elements as $X,$ in the sense of cardinal numbers. In particular, if, in addition, there is an injection from $Y$ to $X$, then $X$ and $Y$ have the same cardinal number. (This is known as the Cantor–Bernstein–Schroeder theorem.)
- If both $X$ and $Y$ are finite with the same number of elements, then $f : X \to Y$ is injective if and only if $f$ is surjective (in which case $f$ is bijective).
- An injective function which is a homomorphism between two algebraic structures is an embedding.
- Unlike surjectivity, which is a relation between the graph of a function and its codomain, injectivity is a property of the graph of the function alone; that is, whether a function $f$ is injective can be decided by only considering the graph (and not the codomain) of $f$.

== Proving that functions are injective ==
A proof that a function $f$ is injective depends on how the function is presented and what properties the function holds. For functions that are given by some formula there is a basic idea. We use the definition of injectivity, namely that if $f(x) = f(y)$, then $x = y$.

Here is an example:
$$f(x) = 2 x + 3$$

Proof: Let $f : X \to Y$. Suppose $f(x) = f(y)$. So $2 x + 3 = 2 y + 3$ implies $2 x = 2 y$, which implies $x = y$. Therefore, it follows from the definition that $f$ is injective.

There are multiple other methods of proving that a function is injective. For example, in calculus if $f$ is a differentiable function defined on some interval, then it is sufficient to show that the derivative is always positive or always negative on that interval. In linear algebra, if $f$ is a linear transformation it is sufficient to show that the kernel of $f$ contains only the zero vector. If $f$ is a function with finite domain it is sufficient to look through the list of images of each domain element and check that no image occurs twice on the list.

A graphical approach for a real-valued function $f$ of a real variable $x$ is the horizontal line test. If every horizontal line intersects the curve of $f(x)$ in at most one point, then $f$ is injective or one-to-one.

== Gallery ==
An injective non-surjective function (injection, not a bijection)

An injective surjective function (bijection)

A non-injective surjective function (surjection, not a bijection)

A non-injective non-surjective function (also not a bijection)
Not an injective function. Here $X_1$ and $X_2$ are subsets of $X, Y_1$ and $Y_2$ are subsets of $Y$: for two regions where the function is not injective because more than one domain element can map to a single range element. That is, it is possible for more than one $x$ in $X$ to map to the same $y$ in $Y$.

Making functions injective. The previous function $f : X \to Y$ can be reduced to one or more injective functions (say) $f : X_1 \to Y_1$ and $f : X_2 \to Y_2$, shown by solid curves (long-dash parts of initial curve are not mapped to anymore). Notice how the rule $f$ has not changed – only the domain and range. $X_1$ and $X_2$ are subsets of $X, Y_1$ and $Y_2$ are subsets of $Y$: for two regions where the initial function can be made injective so that one domain element can map to a single range element. That is, only one $x$ in $X$ maps to one $y$ in $Y$.

Injective functions. Diagramatic interpretation in the Cartesian plane, defined by the mapping $f : X \to Y$, where $y = f(x)$, $X =$ domain of function, $Y =$ range of function, and $\operatorname{im}(f)$ denotes image of $f$. Every one $x$ in $X$ maps to exactly one unique $y$ in $Y$. The circled parts of the axes represent domain and range sets — in accordance with the standard diagrams above

== See also ==
- Bijection, injection and surjection – Properties of mathematical functions
- Injective metric space – Type of metric space
- Monotonic function – Order-preserving mathematical function
- Univalent function – Mathematical concept
