= Maps of manifolds =

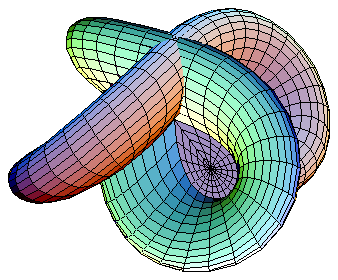
A Morin surface, an immersion used in sphere eversion.

In mathematics, more specifically in differential geometry and topology, various types of maps or functions between manifolds are studied, both as objects in their own right and for the light they shed on the structure of the manifolds they are defined on.

== Types of maps ==
Just as there are various types of manifolds, there are various types of maps of manifolds.

In geometric topology, the basic types of maps correspond to various categories of manifolds: DIFF for smooth functions between differentiable manifolds, PL for piecewise linear functions between piecewise linear manifolds, and TOP for continuous functions between topological manifolds. These are progressively weaker structures, though they are not contained within each other as sets: smooth functions are not piecewise linear, nor are piecewise linear functions smooth, except for globally linear functions. The set of piecewise-smooth manifolds includes both smooth manifolds and piecewise linear manifolds, but piecewise differentiable maps are not closed under composition, so they do not form a category. However, every piecewise smooth manifold admits a piecewise linear structure.

In addition to these general categories of maps, there are maps with special properties; these may or may not form categories, and may or may not be generally discussed categorically.

The right-handed trefoil knot.

In geometric topology a basic type are embeddings, of which knot theory is a central example, and generalizations such as immersions, submersions, covering spaces, and ramified covering spaces. Basic results include the Whitney embedding theorem and Whitney immersion theorem.

Riemann surface for the function f(z) = √z, shown as a ramified covering space of the complex plane.

In complex geometry, ramified covering spaces are used to model Riemann surfaces, and to analyze maps between surfaces, such as by the Riemann–Hurwitz formula.

In Riemannian geometry, one may ask for maps to preserve the Riemannian metric, leading to notions of isometric embeddings, isometric immersions, and Riemannian submersions; a basic result is the Nash embedding theorem.

== Scalar-valued functions ==
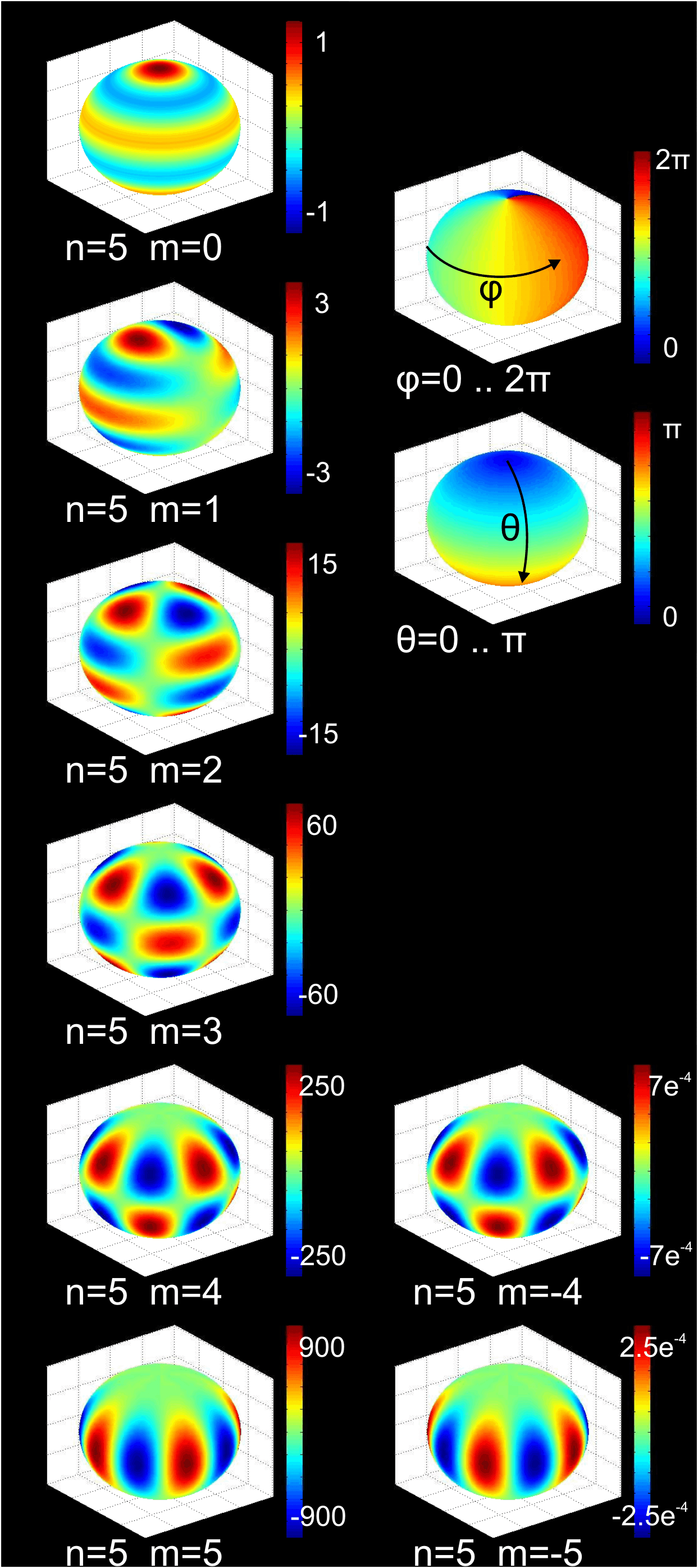
3D color plot of the spherical harmonics of degree $n=5$

A basic example of maps between manifolds are scalar-valued functions on a manifold, $\scriptstyle f\colon M \to \mathbb{R}$ or $\scriptstyle f\colon M \to \mathbb{C},$ sometimes called regular functions or functionals, by analogy with algebraic geometry or linear algebra. These are of interest both in their own right, and to study the underlying manifold.

In geometric topology, most commonly studied are Morse functions, which yield handlebody decompositions, which generalize to Morse–Bott functions and can be used for instance to understand classical groups, such as in Bott periodicity.

In mathematical analysis, one often studies solution to partial differential equations, an important example of which is harmonic analysis, where one studies harmonic functions: the kernel of the Laplace operator. This leads to such functions as the spherical harmonics, and to heat kernel methods of studying manifolds, such as hearing the shape of a drum and some proofs of the Atiyah–Singer index theorem.

The monodromy around a singularity or branch point is an important part of analyzing such functions.

== Curves and paths ==
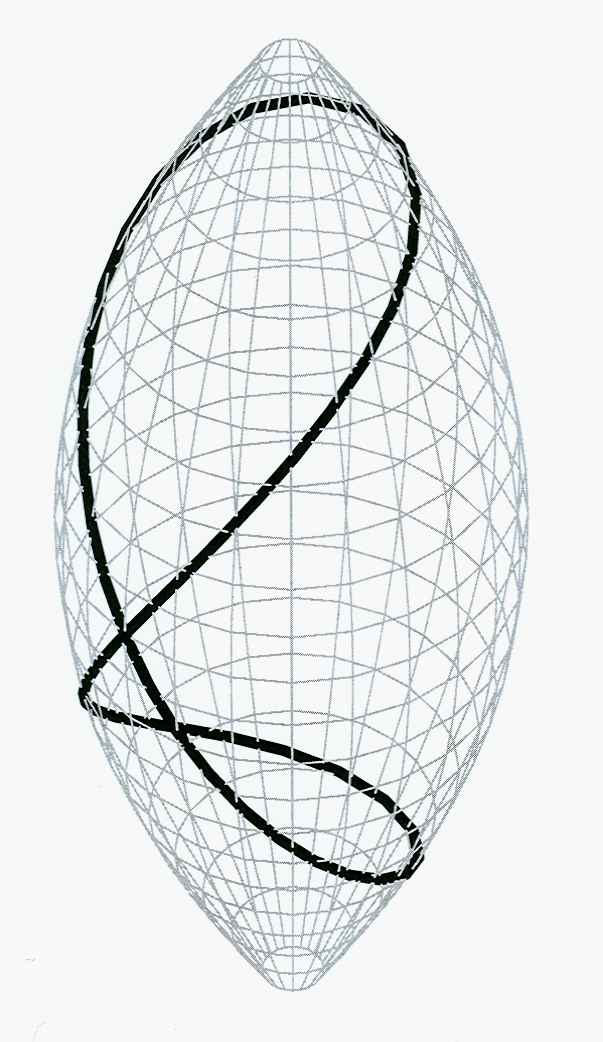
A geodesic on an American football illustrating the proof of Gromov's filling area conjecture in systolic geometry, in the hyperelliptic case (see explanation).

Dual to scalar-valued functions – maps $\scriptstyle M \to \mathbb{R}$ – are maps $\scriptstyle \mathbb{R} \to M,$ which correspond to curves or paths in a manifold. One can also define these where the domain is an interval $[a,b],$ especially the unit interval $[0,1],$ or where the domain is a circle (equivalently, a periodic path) S^{1}, which yields a loop. These are used to define the fundamental group, chains in homology theory, geodesic curves, and systolic geometry.

Embedded paths and loops lead to knot theory, and related structures such as links, braids, and tangles.

== Metric spaces ==
Riemannian manifolds are special cases of metric spaces, and thus one has a notion of Lipschitz continuity, Hölder condition, together with a coarse structure, which leads to notions such as coarse maps and connections with geometric group theory.

== See also ==
- Category:Maps of manifolds
