= Vertical line test =

Test to determine whether a curve is a graph of a function

The vertical line test, shown graphically. The abscissa shows the domain of the (to be tested) function.

In mathematics, the vertical line test is a visual way to determine if a curve is a graph of a function or not. A function can only have one output, y, for each unique input, x. If a vertical line intersects a curve on an xy-plane more than once then for one value of x the curve has more than one value of y, and so, the curve does not represent a function. If all vertical lines intersect a curve at most once then the curve represents a function.

By failing the vertical line test, a curve that does not represent a function may be described more broadly as a multivalued function, where its multiple values are each the intersections with the vertical line. An example is the equation $y^2 = x$, which gives $y = \pm\sqrt{x}$ when solved for $y$. Here, the $\pm$ symbol yields two distinct output values, failing the vertical line test on the domain right of the Y-axis.

== See also ==
- Horizontal line test
