= History of the function concept =

About mathematical functions

The mathematical concept of a function dates from the 17th century in connection with the development of calculus; for example, the slope $dy/dx$ of a graph at a point was regarded as a function of the x-coordinate of the point. Functions were not explicitly considered in antiquity, but some precursors of the concept can perhaps be seen in the work of medieval philosophers and mathematicians such as Oresme.

Mathematicians of the 18th century typically regarded a function as being defined by an analytic expression. In the 19th century, the demands of the rigorous development of analysis by Karl Weierstrass and others, the reformulation of geometry in terms of analysis, and the invention of set theory by Georg Cantor, eventually led to the much more general modern concept of a function as a single-valued mapping from one set to another.

== Functions before the 17th century ==
In the 12th century, mathematician Sharaf al-Din al-Tusi analyzed the equation x^{3} + d = b ⋅ x^{2} in the form x^{2} ⋅ (b – x) = d, stating that the left hand side must at least equal the value of d for the equation to have a solution. He then determined the maximum value of this expression. It is arguable that the isolation of this expression is an early approach to the notion of a "function". A value less than d means no positive solution; a value equal to d corresponds to one solution, while a value greater than d corresponds to two solutions. Sharaf al-Din's analysis of this equation was a notable development in Islamic mathematics, but his work was not pursued any further at that time, neither in the Muslim world nor in Europe.

According to Jean Dieudonné and Ponte, the concept of a function emerged in the 17th century as a result of the development of analytic geometry and the infinitesimal calculus. Nevertheless, Medvedev suggests that the implicit concept of a function is one with an ancient lineage. Ponte also sees more explicit approaches to the concept in the Middle Ages:

Historically, some mathematicians can be regarded as having foreseen and come close to a modern formulation of the concept of function. Among them is [Nicole] Oresme (1323–1382) . . . In his theory, some general ideas about independent and dependent variable quantities seem to be present.

The development of analytical geometry around 1640 allowed mathematicians to go between geometric problems about curves and algebraic relations between "variable coordinates x and y." Calculus was developed using the notion of variables, with their associated geometric meaning, which persisted well into the eighteenth century. However, the terminology of "function" came to be used in interactions between Leibniz and Bernoulli towards the end of the 17th century.

== Notion of function in analysis ==
The term "function" was literally introduced by Gottfried Leibniz, in a 1673 letter, to describe a quantity related to points of a curve, such as a coordinate or curve's slope. Johann Bernoulli started calling expressions made of a single variable "functions." In 1698, he agreed with Leibniz that any quantity formed "in an algebraic and transcendental manner" may be called a function of x. By 1718, he came to regard as a function "any expression made up of a variable and some constants." Alexis Claude Clairaut (in approximately 1734) and Leonhard Euler introduced the familiar notation ${f(x)}$ for the value of a function.

The functions considered in those times are called today differentiable functions. For this type of function, one can talk about limits and derivatives; both are measurements of the output or the change in the output as it depends on the input or the change in the input. Such functions are the basis of calculus.

=== Euler ===
In the first volume of his fundamental text Introductio in analysin infinitorum, published in 1748, Euler gave essentially the same definition of a function as his teacher Bernoulli, as an expression or formula involving variables and constants e.g., ${x^2+3x+2}$. Euler's own definition reads:

A function of a variable quantity is an analytic expression composed in any way whatsoever of the variable quantity and numbers or constant quantities.

Euler also allowed multi-valued functions whose values are determined by an implicit equation.

In 1755, however, in his Institutiones calculi differentialis, Euler gave a more general concept of a function:

When certain quantities depend on others in such a way that they undergo a change when the latter change, then the first are called functions of the second. This name has an extremely broad character; it encompasses all the ways in which one quantity can be determined in terms of others.

Medvedev considers that "In essence this is the definition that became known as Dirichlet's definition." Edwards also credits Euler with a general concept of a function and says further that

The relations among these quantities are not thought of as being given by formulas, but on the other hand they are surely not thought of as being the sort of general set-theoretic, anything-goes subsets of product spaces that modern mathematicians mean when they use the word "function".

=== Fourier ===
In his Théorie Analytique de la Chaleur, Joseph Fourier claimed that an arbitrary function could be represented by a Fourier series. Fourier had a general conception of a function, which included functions that were neither continuous nor defined by an analytical expression. Related questions on the nature and representation of functions, arising from the solution of the wave equation for a vibrating string, had already been the subject of dispute between Jean le Rond d'Alembert and Euler, and they had a significant impact in generalizing the notion of a function. Luzin observes that:

The modern understanding of function and its definition, which seems correct to us, could arise only after Fourier's discovery. His discovery showed clearly that most of the misunderstandings that arose in the debate about the vibrating string were the result of confusing two seemingly identical but actually vastly different concepts, namely that of function and that of its analytic representation. Indeed, prior to Fourier's discovery no distinction was drawn between the concepts of "function" and of "analytic representation," and it was this discovery that brought about their disconnection.

=== Cauchy ===
During the 19th century, mathematicians started to formalize all the different branches of mathematics. One of the first to do so was Augustin-Louis Cauchy; his somewhat imprecise results were later made completely rigorous by Weierstrass, who advocated building calculus on arithmetic rather than on geometry, which favoured Euler's definition over Leibniz's (see arithmetization of analysis). According to Smithies, Cauchy thought of functions as being defined by equations involving real or complex numbers, and tacitly assumed they were continuous:

Cauchy makes some general remarks about functions in Chapter I, Section 1 of his Analyse algébrique (1821). From what he says there, it is clear that he normally regards a function as being defined by an analytic expression (if it is explicit) or by an equation or a system of equations (if it is implicit); where he differs from his predecessors is that he is prepared to consider the possibility that a function may be defined only for a restricted range of the independent variable.

=== Lobachevsky and Dirichlet ===
Nikolai Lobachevsky and Peter Gustav Lejeune Dirichlet are traditionally credited with independently giving the modern "formal" definition of a function as a relation in which every first element has a unique second element.

Lobachevsky (1834) writes that

The general concept of a function requires that a function of x be defined as a number given for each x and varying gradually with x. The value of the function can be given either by an analytic expression, or by a condition that provides a means of examining all numbers and choosing one of them; or finally the dependence may exist but remain unknown.

while Dirichlet (1837) writes

If now a unique finite y corresponding to each x, and moreover in such a way that when x ranges continuously over the interval from a to b, ${y=f(x)}$ also varies continuously, then y is called a continuous function of x for this interval. It is not at all necessary here that y be given in terms of x by one and the same law throughout the entire interval, and it is not necessary that it be regarded as a dependence expressed using mathematical operations.

Eves asserts that "the student of mathematics usually meets the Dirichlet definition of function in his introductory course in calculus.

Dirichlet's claim to this formalization has been disputed by Imre Lakatos:

There is no such definition in Dirichlet's works at all. But there is ample evidence that he had no idea of this concept. In his [1837] paper for instance, when he discusses piecewise continuous functions, he says that at points of discontinuity the function has two values: ...

However, Gardiner says "...it seems to me that Lakatos goes too far, for example, when he asserts that 'there is ample evidence that [Dirichlet] had no idea of [the modern function] concept'." Moreover, as noted above, Dirichlet's paper does appear to include a definition along the lines of what is usually ascribed to him, even though (like Lobachevsky) he states it only for continuous functions of a real variable.

Similarly, Lavine observes that:

It is a matter of some dispute how much credit Dirichlet deserves for the modern definition of a function, in part because he restricted his definition to continuous functions....I believe Dirichlet defined the notion of continuous function to make it clear that no rule or law is required even in the case of continuous functions, not just in general. This would have deserved special emphasis because of Euler's definition of a continuous function as one given by single expression-or law. But I also doubt there is sufficient evidence to settle the dispute.

Because Lobachevsky and Dirichlet have been credited as among the first to introduce the notion of an arbitrary correspondence, this notion is sometimes referred to as the Dirichlet or Lobachevsky-Dirichlet definition of a function. A general version of this definition was later used by Bourbaki (1939), and some in the education community refer to it as the "Dirichlet–Bourbaki" definition of a function.

=== Dedekind ===
Dieudonné, who was one of the founding members of the Bourbaki group, credits a precise and general modern definition of a function to Dedekind in his work Was sind und was sollen die Zahlen, which appeared in 1888 but had already been drafted in 1878. Dieudonné observes that instead of confining himself, as in previous conceptions, to real (or complex) functions, Dedekind defines a function as a single-valued mapping between any two sets:

What was new and what was to be essential for the whole of mathematics was the entirely general conception of a function.

=== Hardy ===
Hardy 1908, pp. 26–28 defined a function as a relation between two variables x and y such that "to some values of x at any rate correspond values of y." He neither required the function to be defined for all values of x nor to associate each value of x to a single value of y. This broad definition of a function encompasses more relations than are ordinarily considered functions in contemporary mathematics. For example, Hardy's definition includes multivalued functions and what in computability theory are called partial functions.

== Logicians' function ==
=== Prior to 1850 ===
Logicians of this time were primarily involved with analyzing syllogisms (the 2000-year-old Aristotelian forms and otherwise), or as Augustus De Morgan (1847) stated it: "the examination of that part of reasoning which depends upon the manner in which inferences are formed, and the investigation of general maxims and rules for constructing arguments". At this time the notion of (logical) "function" is not explicit, but at least in the work of De Morgan and George Boole it is implied: we see abstraction of the argument forms, the introduction of variables, the introduction of a symbolic algebra with respect to these variables, and some of the notions of set theory.

De Morgan's 1847 "FORMAL LOGIC OR, The Calculus of Inference, Necessary and Probable" observes that "[a] logical truth depends upon the structure of the statement, and not upon the particular matters spoken of"; he wastes no time (preface page i) abstracting: "In the form of the proposition, the copula is made as abstract as the terms". He immediately (p. 1) casts what he calls "the proposition" (present-day propositional function or relation) into a form such as "X is Y", where the symbols X, "is", and Y represent, respectively, the subject, copula, and predicate. While the word "function" does not appear, the notion of "abstraction" is there, "variables" are there, the notion of inclusion in his symbolism "all of the Δ is in the О" (p. 9) is there, and lastly a new symbolism for logical analysis of the notion of "relation" (he uses the word with respect to this example " X)Y " (p. 75) ) is there:

" A_{1} X)Y To take an X it is necessary to take a Y" [or To be an X it is necessary to be a Y]
" A^{1} Y)X To take a Y it is sufficient to take a X" [or To be a Y it is sufficient to be an X], etc.

In his 1848 The Nature of Logic Boole asserts that "logic . . . is in a more especial sense the science of reasoning by signs", and he briefly discusses the notions of "belonging to" and "class": "An individual may possess a great variety of attributes and thus belonging to a great variety of different classes". Like De Morgan he uses the notion of "variable" drawn from analysis; he gives an example of "represent[ing] the class oxen by x and that of horses by y and the conjunction and by the sign + . . . we might represent the aggregate class oxen and horses by x + y".

In the context of "the Differential Calculus" Boole defined (circa 1849) the notion of a function as follows:

"That quantity whose variation is uniform . . . is called the independent variable. That quantity whose variation is referred to the variation of the former is said to be a function of it. The Differential calculus enables us in every case to pass from the function to the limit. This it does by a certain Operation. But in the very Idea of an Operation is . . . the idea of an inverse operation. To effect that inverse operation in the present instance is the business of the Int[egral] Calculus."

== Logicians' function 1850–1950 ==
Eves observes "that logicians have endeavored to push down further the starting level of the definitional development of mathematics and to derive the theory of sets, or classes, from a foundation in the logic of propositions and propositional functions". But by the late 19th century the logicians' research into the foundations of mathematics was undergoing a major split. The direction of the first group, the Logicists, can probably be summed up best by Bertrand Russell 1903 – "to fulfil two objects, first, to show that all mathematics follows from symbolic logic, and secondly to discover, as far as possible, what are the principles of symbolic logic itself."

The second group of logicians, the set-theorists, emerged with Georg Cantor's "set theory" (1870–1890) but were driven forward partly as a result of Russell's discovery of a paradox that could be derived from Frege's conception of "function", but also as a reaction against Russell's proposed solution. Ernst Zermelo's set-theoretic response was his 1908 Investigations in the foundations of set theory I – the first axiomatic set theory; here too the notion of "propositional function" plays a role.

=== George Boole's The Laws of Thought 1854; John Venn's Symbolic Logic 1881 ===
In his An Investigation into the laws of thought Boole now defined a function in terms of a symbol x as follows:

"8. Definition. – Any algebraic expression involving symbol x is termed a function of x, and may be represented by the abbreviated form f(x)"

Boole then used algebraic expressions to define both algebraic and logical notions, e.g., 1 − x is logical NOT(x), xy is the logical AND(x,y), x + y is the logical OR(x, y), x(x + y) is xx + xy, and "the special law" xx = x^{2} = x.

In his 1881 Symbolic Logic Venn was using the words "logical function" and the contemporary symbolism (x = f(y), y = f^{−1}(x), cf page xxi) plus the circle-diagrams historically associated with Venn to describe "class relations", the notions "'quantifying' our predicate", "propositions in respect of their extension", "the relation of inclusion and exclusion of two classes to one another", and "propositional function" (all on p. 10), the bar over a variable to indicate not-x (page 43), etc. Indeed he equated unequivocally the notion of "logical function" with "class" [modern "set"]: "... on the view adopted in this book, f(x) never stands for anything but a logical class. It may be a compound class aggregated of many simple classes; it may be a class indicated by certain inverse logical operations, it may be composed of two groups of classes equal to one another, or what is the same thing, their difference declared equal to zero, that is, a logical equation. But however composed or derived, f(x) with us will never be anything else than a general expression for such logical classes of things as may fairly find a place in ordinary Logic".

=== Frege's Begriffsschrift 1879 ===
Gottlob Frege's Begriffsschrift (1879) preceded Giuseppe Peano (1889), but Peano had no knowledge of Frege 1879 until after he had published his 1889. Both writers strongly influenced Russell (1903). Russell in turn influenced much of 20th-century mathematics and logic through his Principia Mathematica (1913) jointly authored with Alfred North Whitehead.

At the outset Frege abandons the traditional "concepts subject and predicate", replacing them with argument and function respectively, which he believes "will stand the test of time. It is easy to see how regarding a content as a function of an argument leads to the formation of concepts. Furthermore, the demonstration of the connection between the meanings of the words if, and, not, or, there is, some, all, and so forth, deserves attention".

Frege begins his discussion of "function" with an example: Begin with the expression "Hydrogen is lighter than carbon dioxide". Now remove the sign for hydrogen (i.e., the word "hydrogen") and replace it with the sign for oxygen (i.e., the word "oxygen"); this makes a second statement. Do this again (using either statement) and substitute the sign for nitrogen (i.e., the word "nitrogen") and note that "This changes the meaning in such a way that "oxygen" or "nitrogen" enters into the relations in which "hydrogen" stood before". There are three statements:

- "Hydrogen is lighter than carbon dioxide."
- "Oxygen is lighter than carbon dioxide."
- "Nitrogen is lighter than carbon dioxide."

Now observe in all three a "stable component, representing the totality of [the] relations"; call this the function, i.e.,

"... is lighter than carbon dioxide", is the function.

Frege calls the argument of the function "[t]he sign [e.g., hydrogen, oxygen, or nitrogen], regarded as replaceable by others that denotes the object standing in these relations". He notes that we could have derived the function as "Hydrogen is lighter than . . .." as well, with an argument position on the right; the exact observation is made by Peano (see more below). Finally, Frege allows for the case of two (or more) arguments. For example, remove "carbon dioxide" to yield the invariant part (the function) as:

- "... is lighter than ... "

The one-argument function Frege generalizes into the form Φ(A) where A is the argument and Φ( ) represents the function, whereas the two-argument function he symbolizes as Ψ(A, B) with A and B the arguments and Ψ( , ) the function and cautions that "in general Ψ(A, B) differs from Ψ(B, A)". Using his unique symbolism he translates for the reader the following symbolism:

"We can read |--- Φ(A) as "A has the property Φ. |--- Ψ(A, B) can be translated by "B stands in the relation Ψ to A" or "B is a result of an application of the procedure Ψ to the object A".

=== Peano's The Principles of Arithmetic 1889 ===
Peano defined the notion of "function" in a manner somewhat similar to Frege, but without the precision. First Peano defines the sign "K means class, or aggregate of objects", the objects of which satisfy three simple equality-conditions, a = a, (a = b) = (b = a), IF ((a = b) AND (b = c)) THEN (a = c). He then introduces φ, "a sign or an aggregate of signs such that if x is an object of the class s, the expression φx denotes a new object". Peano adds two conditions on these new objects: First, that the three equality-conditions hold for the objects φx; secondly, that "if x and y are objects of class s and if x = y, we assume it is possible to deduce φx = φy". Given all these conditions are met, φ is a "function presign". Likewise he identifies a "function postsign". For example if φ is the function presign a+, then φx yields a+x, or if φ is the function postsign +a then xφ yields x+a.

=== Bertrand Russell's The Principles of Mathematics 1903 ===
While the influence of Cantor and Peano was paramount, in Appendix A "The Logical and Arithmetical Doctrines of Frege" of The Principles of Mathematics, Russell arrives at a discussion of Frege's notion of function, "...a point in which Frege's work is very important, and requires careful examination". In response to his 1902 exchange of letters with Frege about the contradiction he discovered in Frege's Begriffsschrift Russell tacked this section on at the last moment.

For Russell the bedeviling notion is that of variable: "6. Mathematical propositions are not only characterized by the fact that they assert implications, but also by the fact that they contain variables. The notion of the variable is one of the most difficult with which logic has to deal. For the present, I openly wish to make it plain that there are variables in all mathematical propositions, even where at first sight they might seem to be absent. . . . We shall find always, in all mathematical propositions, that the words any or some occur; and these words are the marks of a variable and a formal implication".

As expressed by Russell "the process of transforming constants in a proposition into variables leads to what is called generalization, and gives us, as it were, the formal essence of a proposition ... So long as any term in our proposition can be turned into a variable, our proposition can be generalized; and so long as this is possible, it is the business of mathematics to do it"; these generalizations Russell named propositional functions. Indeed he cites and quotes from Frege's Begriffsschrift and presents a vivid example from Frege's 1891 Function und Begriff: That "the essence of the arithmetical function 2x^{3} + x is what is left when the x is taken away, i.e., in the above instance 2( )^{3} + ( ). The argument x does not belong to the function but the two taken together make the whole". Russell agreed with Frege's notion of "function" in one sense: "He regards functions – and in this I agree with him – as more fundamental than predicates and relations" but Russell rejected Frege's "theory of subject and assertion", in particular "he thinks that, if a term a occurs in a proposition, the proposition can always be analysed into a and an assertion about a".

=== Evolution of Russell's notion of "function" 1908–1913 ===
Russell would carry his ideas forward in his 1908 Mathematical logical as based on the theory of types and into his and Whitehead's 1910–1913 Principia Mathematica. By the time of Principia Mathematica Russell, like Frege, considered the propositional function fundamental: "Propositional functions are the fundamental kind from which the more usual kinds of function, such as "sin x" or log x or "the father of x" are derived. These derivative functions . . . are called "descriptive functions". The functions of propositions . . . are a particular case of propositional functions".

Propositional functions: Because his terminology is different from the contemporary, the reader may be confused by Russell's "propositional function". An example may help. Russell writes a propositional function in its raw form, e.g., as φŷ: "ŷ is hurt". (Observe the circumflex or "hat" over the variable y). For our example, we will assign just 4 values to the variable ŷ: "Bob", "This bird", "Emily the rabbit", and "y". Substitution of one of these values for variable ŷ yields a proposition; this proposition is called a "value" of the propositional function. In our example there are four values of the propositional function, e.g., "Bob is hurt", "This bird is hurt", "Emily the rabbit is hurt" and "y is hurt." A proposition, if it is significant—i.e., if its truth is determinate—has a truth-value of truth or falsity. If a proposition's truth value is "truth" then the variable's value is said to satisfy the propositional function. Finally, per Russell's definition, "a class [set] is all objects satisfying some propositional function" (p. 23). Note the word "all" – this is how the contemporary notions of "For all ∀" and "there exists at least one instance ∃" enter the treatment (p. 15).

To continue the example: Suppose (from outside the mathematics/logic) one determines that the propositions "Bob is hurt" has a truth value of "falsity", "This bird is hurt" has a truth value of "truth", "Emily the rabbit is hurt" has an indeterminate truth value because "Emily the rabbit" doesn't exist, and "y is hurt" is ambiguous as to its truth value because the argument y itself is ambiguous. While the two propositions "Bob is hurt" and "This bird is hurt" are significant (both have truth values), only the value "This bird" of the variable ŷ satisfies the propositional function φŷ: "ŷ is hurt". When one goes to form the class α: φŷ: "ŷ is hurt", only "This bird" is included, given the four values "Bob", "This bird", "Emily the rabbit" and "y" for variable ŷ and their respective truth-values: falsity, truth, indeterminate, ambiguous.

Russell defines functions of propositions with arguments, and truth-functions f(p). For example, suppose one were to form the "function of propositions with arguments" p_{1}: "NOT(p) AND q" and assign its variables the values of p: "Bob is hurt" and q: "This bird is hurt". (We are restricted to the logical linkages NOT, AND, OR and IMPLIES, and we can only assign "significant" propositions to the variables p and q). Then the "function of propositions with arguments" is p_{1}: NOT("Bob is hurt") AND "This bird is hurt". To determine the truth value of this "function of propositions with arguments" we submit it to a "truth function", e.g., f(p_{1}): f( NOT("Bob is hurt") AND "This bird is hurt" ), which yields a truth value of "truth".

The notion of a "many-one" functional relation": Russell first discusses the notion of "identity", then defines a descriptive function (pages 30ff) as the unique value ιx that satisfies the (2-variable) propositional function (i.e., "relation") φŷ.

N.B. The reader should be warned here that the order of the variables are reversed! y is the independent variable and x is the dependent variable, e.g., x = sin(y).

Russell symbolizes the descriptive function as "the object standing in relation to y": R'y =_{DEF} (ιx)(x R y). Russell repeats that "R'y is a function of y, but not a propositional function [sic]; we shall call it a descriptive function. All the ordinary functions of mathematics are of this kind. Thus in our notation "sin y" would be written " sin 'y ", and "sin" would stand for the relation sin 'y has to y".

== Formalist's function: David Hilbert's axiomatization of mathematics (1904–1927) ==
David Hilbert set himself the goal of "formalizing" classical mathematics "as a formal axiomatic theory, and this theory shall be proved to be consistent, i.e., free from contradiction". In Hilbert 1927 The Foundations of Mathematics he frames the notion of function in terms of the existence of an "object":

13. A(a) --> A(ε(A)) Here ε(A) stands for an object of which the proposition A(a) certainly holds if it holds of any object at all; let us call ε the logical ε-function". [The arrow indicates "implies".]

Hilbert then illustrates the three ways how the ε-function is to be used, firstly as the "for all" and "there exists" notions, secondly to represent the "object of which [a proposition] holds", and lastly how to cast it into the choice function.

Recursion theory and computability: But the unexpected outcome of Hilbert's and his student Bernays's effort was failure; see Gödel's incompleteness theorems of 1931. At about the same time, in an effort to solve Hilbert's Entscheidungsproblem, mathematicians set about to define what was meant by an "effectively calculable function" (Alonzo Church 1936), i.e., "effective method" or "algorithm", that is, an explicit, step-by-step procedure that would succeed in computing a function. Various models for algorithms appeared, in rapid succession, including Church's lambda calculus (1936), Stephen Kleene's μ-recursive functions(1936) and Alan Turing's (1936–7) notion of replacing human "computers" with utterly-mechanical "computing machines" (see Turing machines). It was shown that all of these models could compute the same class of computable functions. Church's thesis holds that this class of functions exhausts all the number-theoretic functions that can be calculated by an algorithm. The outcomes of these efforts were vivid demonstrations that, in Turing's words, "there can be no general process for determining whether a given formula U of the functional calculus K [Principia Mathematica] is provable"; see more at Independence (mathematical logic) and Computability theory.

== Development of the set-theoretic definition ==
Set theory began with the work of the logicians with the notion of "class" (modern "set") for example De Morgan (1847), Jevons (1880), Venn (1881), Frege (1879) and Peano (1889). It was given a push by Georg Cantor's attempt to define the infinite in set-theoretic treatment (1870–1890) and a subsequent discovery of an antinomy (contradiction, paradox) in this treatment (Cantor's paradox), by Russell's discovery (1902) of an antinomy in Frege's 1879 (Russell's paradox), by the discovery of more antinomies in the early 20th century (e.g., the 1897 Burali-Forti paradox and the 1905 Richard paradox), and by resistance to Russell's complex treatment of logic and dislike of his axiom of reducibility (1908, 1910–1913) that he proposed as a means to evade the antinomies.

=== Russell's paradox 1902 ===
In 1902 Russell sent a letter to Frege pointing out that Frege's 1879 Begriffsschrift allowed a function to be an argument of itself: "On the other hand, it may also be that the argument is determinate and the function indeterminate . . .." From this unconstrained situation Russell was able to form a paradox:

"You state ... that a function, too, can act as the indeterminate element. This I formerly believed, but now this view seems doubtful to me because of the following contradiction. Let w be the predicate: to be a predicate that cannot be predicated of itself. Can w be predicated of itself?"

Frege responded promptly that "Your discovery of the contradiction caused me the greatest surprise and, I would almost say, consternation, since it has shaken the basis on which I intended to build arithmetic".

From this point forward development of the foundations of mathematics became an exercise in how to dodge "Russell's paradox", framed as it was in "the bare [set-theoretic] notions of set and element".

=== Zermelo's set theory (1908) modified by Skolem (1922) ===
The notion of "function" appears as Zermelo's axiom III—the Axiom of Separation (Axiom der Aussonderung). This axiom constrains us to use a propositional function Φ(x) to "separate" a subset M_{Φ} from a previously formed set M:

"AXIOM III. (Axiom of separation). Whenever the propositional function Φ(x) is definite for all elements of a set M, M possesses a subset M_{Φ} containing as elements precisely those elements x of M for which Φ(x) is true".

As there is no universal set — sets originate by way of Axiom II from elements of (non-set) domain B – "...this disposes of the Russell antinomy so far as we are concerned". But Zermelo's "definite criterion" is imprecise, and is fixed by Weyl, Fraenkel, Skolem, and von Neumann.

In fact Skolem in his 1922 referred to this "definite criterion" or "property" as a "definite proposition":

"... a finite expression constructed from elementary propositions of the form a ε b or a = b by means of the five operations [logical conjunction, disjunction, negation, universal quantification, and existential quantification].

van Heijenoort summarizes:

"A property is definite in Skolem's sense if it is expressed . . . by a well-formed formula in the simple predicate calculus of first order in which the sole predicate constants are ε and possibly, =. ... Today an axiomatization of set theory is usually embedded in a logical calculus, and it is Weyl's and Skolem's approach to the formulation of the axiom of separation that is generally adopted."

In this quote the reader may observe a shift in terminology: nowhere is mentioned the notion of "propositional function", but rather one sees the words "formula", "predicate calculus", "predicate", and "logical calculus." This shift in terminology is discussed more in the section that covers "function" in contemporary set theory.

=== Wiener–Hausdorff–Kuratowski ordered pair definition 1914–1921 ===
The history of the notion of "ordered pair" is not clear. As noted above, Frege (1879) proposed an intuitive ordering in his definition of a two-argument function Ψ(A, B). Norbert Wiener in his 1914 (see below) observes that his own treatment essentially "revert(s) to Schröder's treatment of a relation as a class of ordered couples". Russell (1903) considered the definition of a relation (such as Ψ(A, B)) as a "class of couples" but rejected it:

"There is a temptation to regard a relation as definable in extension as a class of couples. This is the formal advantage that it avoids the necessity for the primitive proposition asserting that every couple has a relation holding between no other pairs of terms. But it is necessary to give sense to the couple, to distinguish the referent [domain] from the relatum [converse domain]: thus a couple becomes essentially distinct from a class of two terms, and must itself be introduced as a primitive idea. . . . It seems therefore more correct to take an intensional view of relations, and to identify them rather with class-concepts than with classes."

By 1910–1913 and Principia Mathematica Russell had given up on the requirement for an intensional definition of a relation, stating that "mathematics is always concerned with extensions rather than intensions" and "Relations, like classes, are to be taken in extension". To demonstrate the notion of a relation in extension Russell now embraced the notion of ordered couple: "We may regard a relation ... as a class of couples ... the relation determined by φ(x, y) is the class of couples (x, y) for which φ(x, y) is true". In a footnote he clarified his notion and arrived at this definition:

"Such a couple has a sense, i.e., the couple (x, y) is different from the couple (y, x) unless x = y. We shall call it a "couple with sense," ... it may also be called an ordered couple.

But he goes on to say that he would not introduce the ordered couples further into his "symbolic treatment"; he proposes his "matrix" and his unpopular axiom of reducibility in their place.

An attempt to solve the problem of the antinomies led Russell to propose his "doctrine of types" in an appendix B of his 1903 The Principles of Mathematics. In a few years he would refine this notion and propose in his 1908 The Theory of Types two axioms of reducibility, the purpose of which were to reduce (single-variable) propositional functions and (dual-variable) relations to a "lower" form (and ultimately into a completely extensional form); he and Alfred North Whitehead would carry this treatment over to Principia Mathematica 1910–1913 with a further refinement called "a matrix". The first axiom is *12.1; the second is *12.11. To quote Wiener the second axiom *12.11 "is involved only in the theory of relations". Both axioms, however, were met with skepticism and resistance; see more at Axiom of reducibility. By 1914 Norbert Wiener, using Whitehead and Russell's symbolism, eliminated axiom *12.11 (the "two-variable" (relational) version of the axiom of reducibility) by expressing a relation as an ordered pair using the null set. At approximately the same time, Hausdorff (1914, p. 32) gave the definition of the ordered pair (a, b) as {{a,1}, {b, 2}}. A few years later Kuratowski (1921) offered a definition that has been widely used ever since, namely {{a, b}, {a}}". As noted by Suppes (1960) "This definition . . . was historically important in reducing the theory of relations to the theory of sets.

Observe that while Wiener "reduced" the relational *12.11 form of the axiom of reducibility he did not reduce nor otherwise change the propositional-function form *12.1; indeed he declared this "essential to the treatment of identity, descriptions, classes and relations".

=== Schönfinkel's notion of function as a many-one correspondence 1924 ===
Where exactly the general notion of "function" as a many-one correspondence derives from is unclear. Russell in his 1920 Introduction to Mathematical Philosophy states that "It should be observed that all mathematical functions result form one-many [sic – contemporary usage is many-one] relations . . . Functions in this sense are descriptive functions". A reasonable possibility is the Principia Mathematica notion of "descriptive function" – R 'y =_{DEF} (ιx)(x R y): "the singular object that has a relation R to y". Whatever the case, by 1924, Moses Schönfinkel expressed the notion, claiming it to be "well known":

"As is well known, by function we mean in the simplest case a correspondence between the elements of some domain of quantities, the argument domain, and those of a domain of function values ... such that to each argument value there corresponds at most one function value".

According to Willard Quine, Schönfinkel 1924 "provide[s] for ... the whole sweep of abstract set theory. The crux of the matter is that Schönfinkel lets functions stand as arguments. For Schönfinkel, substantially as for Frege, classes are special sorts of functions. They are propositional functions, functions whose values are truth values. All functions, propositional and otherwise, are for Schönfinkel one-place functions". Remarkably, Schönfinkel reduces all mathematics to an extremely compact functional calculus consisting of only three functions: Constancy, fusion (i.e., composition), and mutual exclusivity. Quine notes that Haskell Curry (1958) carried this work forward "under the head of combinatory logic".

=== Von Neumann's set theory 1925 ===
By 1925 Abraham Fraenkel (1922) and Thoralf Skolem (1922) had amended Zermelo's set theory of 1908. But von Neumann was not convinced that this axiomatization could not lead to the antinomies. So he proposed his own theory, his 1925 An axiomatization of set theory. It explicitly contains a "contemporary", set-theoretic version of the notion of "function":

"[Unlike Zermelo's set theory] [w]e prefer, however, to axiomatize not "set" but "function". The latter notion certainly includes the former. (More precisely, the two notions are completely equivalent, since a function can be regarded as a set of pairs, and a set as a function that can take two values.)".

At the outset he begins with I-objects and II-objects, two objects A and B that are I-objects (first axiom), and two types of "operations" that assume ordering as a structural property obtained of the resulting objects [x, y] and (x, y). The two "domains of objects" are called "arguments" (I-objects) and "functions" (II-objects); where they overlap are the "argument functions" (he calls them I-II objects). He introduces two "universal two-variable operations" – (i) the operation [x, y]: ". . . read 'the value of the function x for the argument y . . . it itself is a type I object", and (ii) the operation (x, y): ". . . (read 'the ordered pair x, y') whose variables x and y must both be arguments and that itself produces an argument (x, y). Its most important property is that x_{1} = x_{2} and y_{1} = y_{2} follow from (x_{1} = y_{2}) = (x_{2} = y_{2})". To clarify the function pair he notes that "Instead of f(x) we write [f,x] to indicate that f, just like x, is to be regarded as a variable in this procedure". To avoid the "antinomies of naive set theory, in Russell's first of all . . . we must forgo treating certain functions as arguments". He adopts a notion from Zermelo to restrict these "certain functions".

Suppes observes that von Neumann's axiomatization was modified by Bernays "in order to remain nearer to the original Zermelo system . . . He introduced two membership relations: one between sets, and one between sets and classes". Then Gödel [1940] further modified the theory: "his primitive notions are those of set, class and membership (although membership alone is sufficient)". This axiomatization is now known as von Neumann–Bernays–Gödel set theory.

=== Bourbaki 1939 ===
In 1939, the collaboration Nicolas Bourbaki, in addition to giving the well-known ordered pair definition of a function as a certain subset of the cartesian product E × F, gave the following:

"Let E and F be two sets, which may or may not be distinct. A relation between a variable element x of E and a variable element y of F is called a functional relation in y if, for all x ∈ E, there exists a unique y ∈ F which is in the given relation with x. We give the name of function to the operation which in this way associates with every element x ∈ E the element y ∈ F which is in the given relation with x, and the function is said to be determined by the given functional relation. Two equivalent functional relations determine the same function."

== Since 1950 ==
=== In contemporary set theory ===
Both axiomatic and naive forms of Zermelo's set theory as modified by Fraenkel (1922) and Skolem (1922) define "function" as a relation, define a relation as a set of ordered pairs, and define an ordered pair as a set of two "dissymetric" sets.

While the reader of Suppes (1960) Axiomatic Set Theory or Halmos (1970) Naive Set Theory observes the use of function-symbolism in the axiom of separation, e.g., φ(x) (in Suppes) and S(x) (in Halmos), they will see no mention of "proposition" or even "first order predicate calculus". In their place are "expressions of the object language", "atomic formulae", "primitive formulae", and "atomic sentences".

Kleene (1952) defines the words as follows: "In word languages, a proposition is expressed by a sentence. Then a 'predicate' is expressed by an incomplete sentence or sentence skeleton containing an open place. For example, "___ is a man" expresses a predicate ... The predicate is a propositional function of one variable. Predicates are often called 'properties' ... The predicate calculus will treat of the logic of predicates in this general sense of 'predicate', i.e., as propositional function".

In 1954, Bourbaki, on p. 76 in Chapitre II of Theorie des Ensembles (theory of sets), gave a definition of a function as a triple f = (F, A, B). Here F is a functional graph, meaning a set of pairs where no two pairs have the same first member. On p. 77 (op. cit.) Bourbaki states (literal translation): "Often we shall use, in the remainder of this Treatise, the word function instead of functional graph."

Suppes (1960) in Axiomatic Set Theory, formally defines a relation (p. 57) as a set of pairs, and a function (p. 86) as a relation where no two pairs have the same first member.

=== Relational form of a function ===
The reason for the disappearance of the words "propositional function" e.g., in Suppes (1960), and Halmos (1970), is explained by Tarski (1946) together with further explanation of the terminology:

"An expression such as x is an integer, which contains variables and, on replacement of these variables by constants becomes a sentence, is called a SENTENTIAL [i.e., propositional cf his index] FUNCTION. But mathematicians, by the way, are not very fond of this expression, because they use the term "function" with a different meaning. ... sentential functions and sentences composed entirely of mathematical symbols (and not words of everyday language), such as: x + y = 5 are usually referred to by mathematicians as FORMULAE. In place of "sentential function" we shall sometimes simply say "sentence" – but only in cases where there is no danger of any misunderstanding".

For his part Tarski calls the relational form of function a "FUNCTIONAL RELATION or simply a FUNCTION". After a discussion of this "functional relation" he asserts that:

"The concept of a function which we are considering now differs essentially from the concepts of a sentential [propositional] and of a designatory function .... Strictly speaking ... [these] do not belong to the domain of logic or mathematics; they denote certain categories of expressions which serve to compose logical and mathematical statements, but they do not denote things treated of in those statements... . The term "function" in its new sense, on the other hand, is an expression of a purely logical character; it designates a certain type of things dealt with in logic and mathematics."

See more about "truth under an interpretation" at Alfred Tarski.
