= Image (mathematics) =

Set of the values of a function

For the function that maps a Person to their Favorite Food, the image of Gabriela is Apple. The preimage of Apple is the set {Gabriela, Maryam}. The preimage of Fish is the empty set. The image of the subset {Richard, Maryam} is {Rice, Apple}. The preimage of {Rice, Apple} is {Gabriela, Richard, Maryam}. The image of the set Person is {Rice, Bread, Corn, Pasta, Apple}. The preimage of the set Favorite Food is Person.

In mathematics, the image of a function $f: X \to Y$ is the set of all $f(x)$ such that $x$ belongs to the domain of $f$. The image by $f$ of an element $x$ of the domain of $f$ is $f(x)$, that is, the output corresponding to the input $x$. The image by $f$ of a subset $S$ of the domain of $f$ is the set of all $f(x)$ such that $x$ is in $S$, that is, the set of the images of the elements of $S$. Equivalently, it is the image of the restriction of $f$ to $S$.

Preimages or inverse images are defined similarly, by exchanging the roles of the domain and the codomain:

The preimage of an element $y$ of the codomain of $f$ is the set of all elements $x$ of the domain of $f$ such that $f(x)=y$; it is empty if $y$ does not belong to the image of $f$. The preimage of a subset $T$ of the codomain of $f$ is the set of all elements $x$ of the domain of $f$ such that $f(x)\in T$. The preimage of the codomain of $f$ is, by definition of a function, the domain of $f$.

Images and inverse images may also be defined similarly for general binary relations. in this generalization, images and preimages play symmetric roles: the images and the preimages of a relation are respectively the preimages and the images of the opposite relation.

== Definition ==
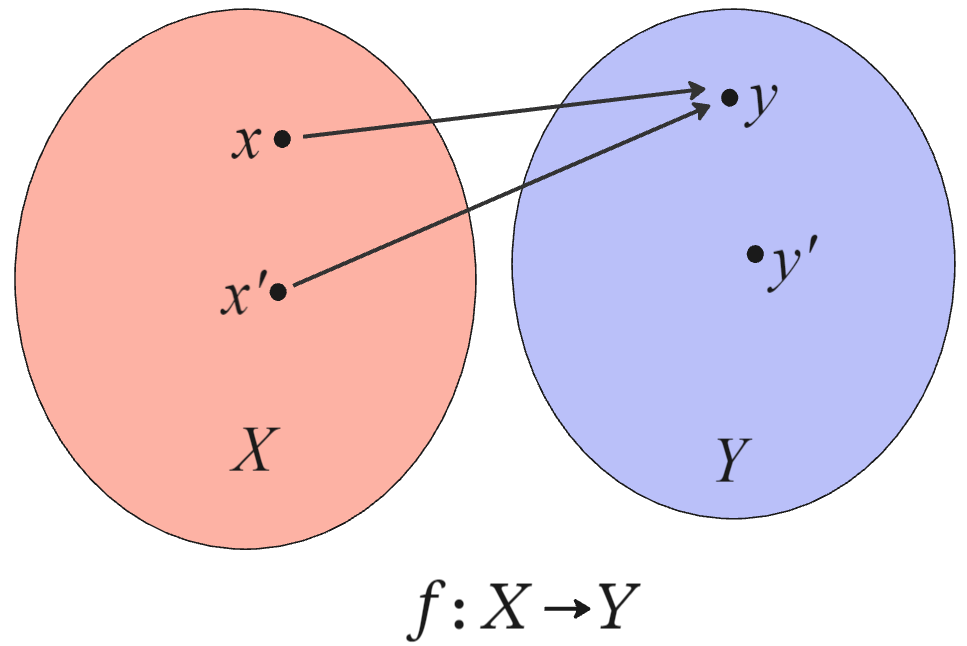
$f$ is a function from domain $X$ to codomain $Y$. The image of element $x$ is element $y$. The preimage of element $y$ is the set {$x, x'$}. The preimage of element $y'$ is $\varnothing$.

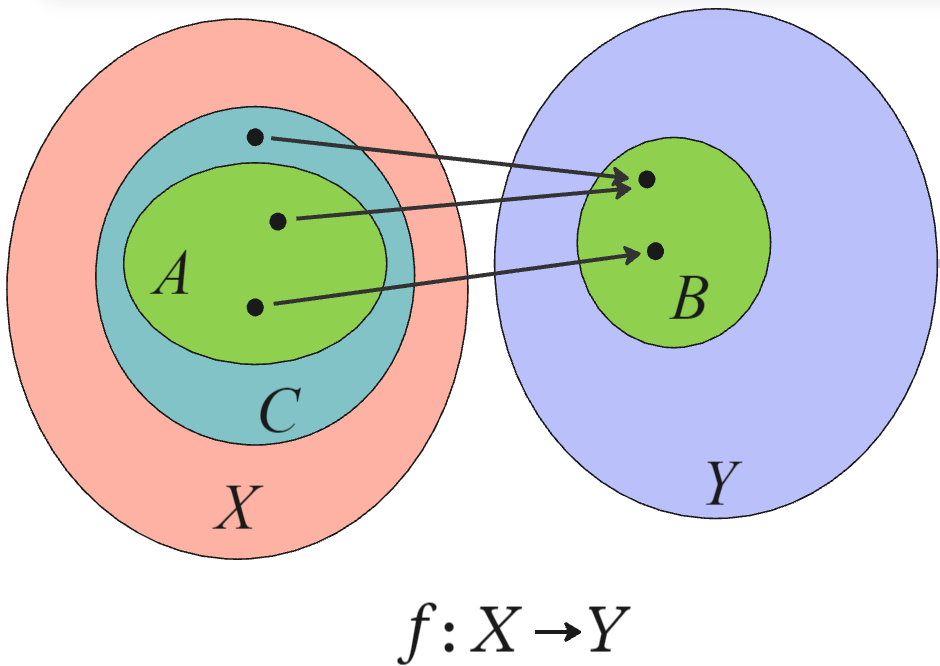
$f$ is a function from domain $X$ to codomain $Y$. The image of all elements in subset $A$ is subset $B$. The preimage of $B$ is subset $C$

$f$ is a function from domain $X$ to codomain $Y$. The yellow oval inside $Y$ is the image of $f$. The preimage of $Y$ is the entire domain $X$

The word "image" is used in three related ways. In these definitions, $f : X \to Y$ is a function from the set $X$ to the set $Y$.

=== Image of an element ===
If $x$ is a member of $X$, then the image of $x$ under $f$, denoted $f(x)$, is the value of $f$ when applied to $x$. $f(x)$ is alternatively known as the output of $f$ for argument $x$.

Given $y$, the function $f$ is said to take the value $y$ or take $y$ as a value if there exists some $x$ in the function's domain such that $f(x) = y$. Similarly, given a set $S,$ $f$ is said to take a value in $S$ if there exists some $x$ in the function's domain such that $f(x) \in S$. However, $f$ takes [all] values in $S$ and $f$ is valued in $S$ means that $f(x) \in S$ for every point $x$ in the domain of $f$.

=== Image of a subset ===
Throughout, let $f : X \to Y$ be a function. The image under $f$ of a subset $A$ of $X$ is the set of all $f(a)$ for $a\in A$. It is denoted by $f[A]$, or by $f(A)$ when there is no risk of confusion. Using set-builder notation, this definition can be written as
$$f[A] = \{f(a) : a \in A\}$$

This induces a function $f[\,\cdot\,] : \mathcal P(X) \to \mathcal P(Y)$, where $\mathcal P(S)$ denotes the power set of a set $S$; that is the set of all subsets of $S$. See § Notation below for more.

=== Image of a function ===
The image of a function is the image of its entire domain, also known as the range of the function. This last usage should be avoided because the word "range" is also commonly used to mean the codomain of $f$.

=== Generalization to binary relations ===
If $R$ is an arbitrary binary relation on $X \times Y$, then the set $\{ y \in Y : x R y \text{ for some } x \in X \}$ is called the image, or the range, of $R$. Dually, the set $\{ x \in X : x R y \text{ for some } y \in Y \}$ is called the domain of $R$.

== Inverse image ==
Let $f$ be a function from $X$ to $Y.$ The preimage or inverse image of a set $B \subseteq Y$ under $f,$ denoted by $f^{-1}[B],$ is the subset of $X$ defined by
$$f^{-1}[ B ] = \{ x \in X \,:\, f(x) \in B \}.$$

Other notations include $f^{-1}(B)$ and $f^{-}(B).$ The inverse image of a singleton set, denoted by $f^{-1}[\{ y \}]$ or by $f^{-1}(y),$ is also called the fiber (or fibre) over $y$, or the level set of $y.$ The set of all the fibers over the elements of $Y$ is a family of sets indexed by $Y.$

For example, for the function $f(x) = x^2,$ the inverse image of $\{ 4 \}$ would be $\{ -2, 2 \}.$ Again, if there is no risk of confusion, $f^{-1}[B]$ can be denoted by $f^{-1}(B),$ and $f^{-1}$ can also be thought of as a function from the power set of $Y$ to the power set of $X.$ The notation $f^{-1}$ should not be confused with that for inverse function, although it coincides with the usual one for bijections in that the inverse image of $B$ under $f$ is the image of $B$ under $f^{-1}.$

== Notation for image and inverse image ==
The traditional notations used in the previous section do not distinguish the original function $f : X \to Y$ from the image-of-sets function $f : \mathcal{P}(X) \to \mathcal{P}(Y)$; likewise they do not distinguish the inverse function (assuming one exists) from the inverse image function (which again relates the powersets). Given the right context, this keeps the notation light and usually does not cause confusion. But if needed, an alternative is to give explicit names for the image and preimage as functions between power sets:

=== Arrow notation ===
- $f^\rightarrow : \mathcal{P}(X) \to \mathcal{P}(Y)$ with $f^\rightarrow(A) = \{ f(a)\;|\; a \in A\}$
- $f^\leftarrow : \mathcal{P}(Y) \to \mathcal{P}(X)$ with $f^\leftarrow(B) = \{ a \in X \;|\; f(a) \in B\}$

=== Star notation ===
- $f_\star : \mathcal{P}(X) \to \mathcal{P}(Y)$ instead of $f^\rightarrow$
- $f^\star : \mathcal{P}(Y) \to \mathcal{P}(X)$ instead of $f^\leftarrow$

=== Other terminology ===
- An alternative notation for $f[A]$ used in mathematical logic and set theory is $f\,''A.$
- Some texts refer to the image of $f$ as the range of $f,$ but this usage should be avoided because the word "range" is also commonly used to mean the codomain of $f.$

== Examples ==
1. $f : \{ 1, 2, 3 \} \to \{ a, b, c, d \}$ defined by
  $$\left\{\begin{matrix}
1 \mapsto a, \\
2 \mapsto a, \\
3 \mapsto c.
\end{matrix}\right.$$
  The image of the set $\{ 2, 3 \}$ under $f$ is $f(\{ 2, 3 \}) = \{ a, c \}.$ The image of the function $f$ is $\{ a, c \}.$ The preimage of $a$ is $f^{-1}(\{ a \}) = \{ 1, 2 \}.$ The preimage of $\{ a, b \}$ is also $f^{-1}(\{ a, b \}) = \{ 1, 2 \}.$ The preimage of $\{ b, d \}$ under $f$ is the empty set $\{ \ \} = \emptyset.$
2. $f : \R \to \R$ defined by $f(x) = x^2.$
  The image of $\{ -2, 3 \}$ under $f$ is $f(\{ -2, 3 \}) = \{ 4, 9 \},$ and the image of $f$ is $\R^+$ (the set of all positive real numbers and zero). The preimage of $\{ 4, 9 \}$ under $f$ is $f^{-1}(\{ 4, 9 \}) = \{ -3, -2, 2, 3 \}.$ The preimage of set $N = \{ n \in \R : n < 0 \}$ under $f$ is the empty set, because the negative numbers do not have square roots in the set of reals.
3. $f : \R^2 \to \R$ defined by $f(x, y) = x^2 + y^2.$
  The fibers $f^{-1}(\{ a \})$ are concentric circles about the origin, the origin itself, and the empty set (respectively), depending on whether $a > 0, \ a = 0, \text{ or } \ a < 0$ (respectively). (If $a \ge 0,$ then the fiber $f^{-1}(\{ a \})$ is the set of all $(x, y) \in \R^2$ satisfying the equation $x^2 + y^2 = a,$ that is, the origin-centered circle with radius $\sqrt{a}.$)
4. If $M$ is a manifold and $\pi : TM \to M$ is the canonical projection from the tangent bundle $TM$ to $M,$ then the fibers of $\pi$ are the tangent spaces $T_x(M) \text{ for } x \in M.$ This is also an example of a fiber bundle.
5. A quotient group is a homomorphic image.

== Properties ==
Counter-examples based on the real numbers $\R,$
$f : \R \to \R$ defined by $x \mapsto x^2,$
showing that equality generally need
not hold for some laws:

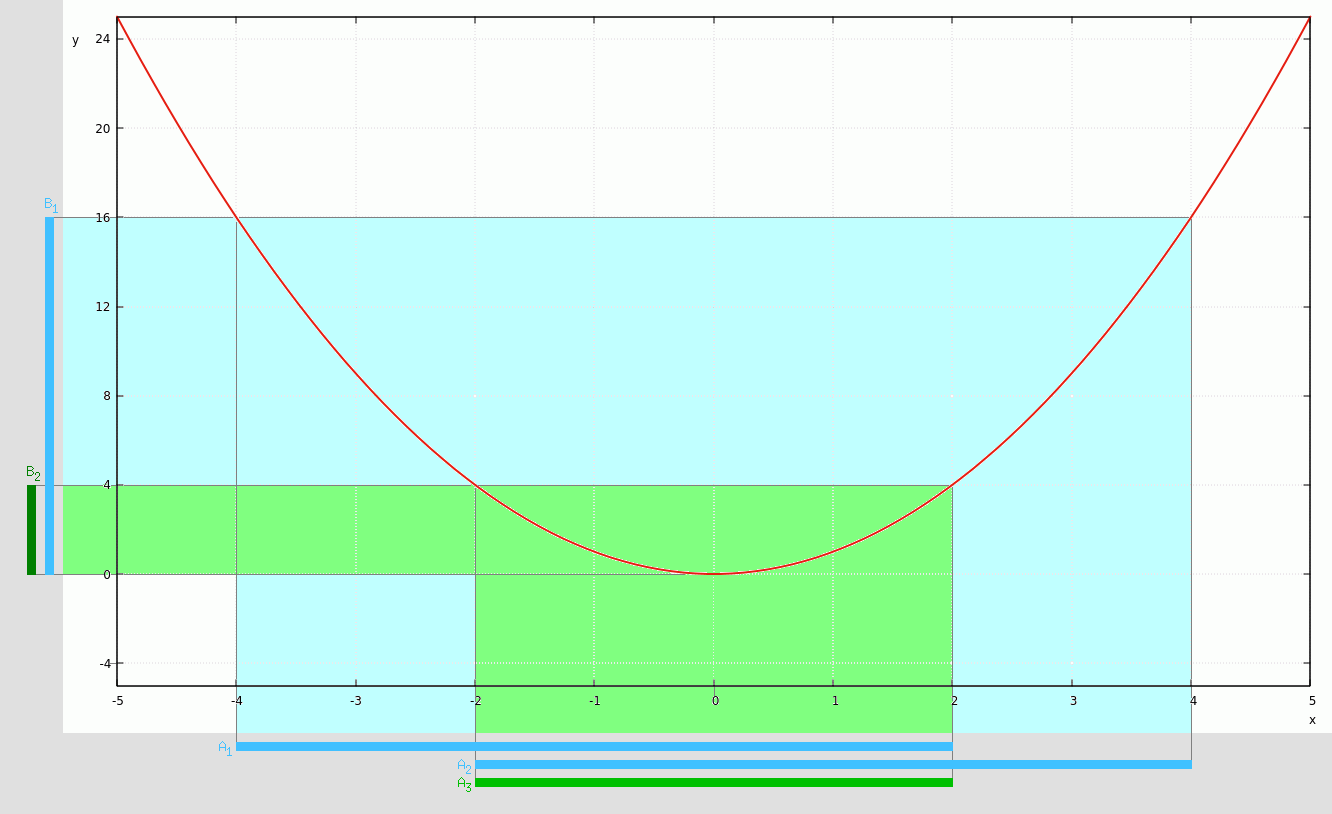
Image showing non-equal sets: $f\left(A \cap B\right) \subsetneq f(A) \cap f(B).$ The sets $A = [-4, 2]$ and $B = [-2, 4]$ are shown in blue immediately below the $x$-axis while their intersection $A_3 = [-2, 2]$ is shown in green.

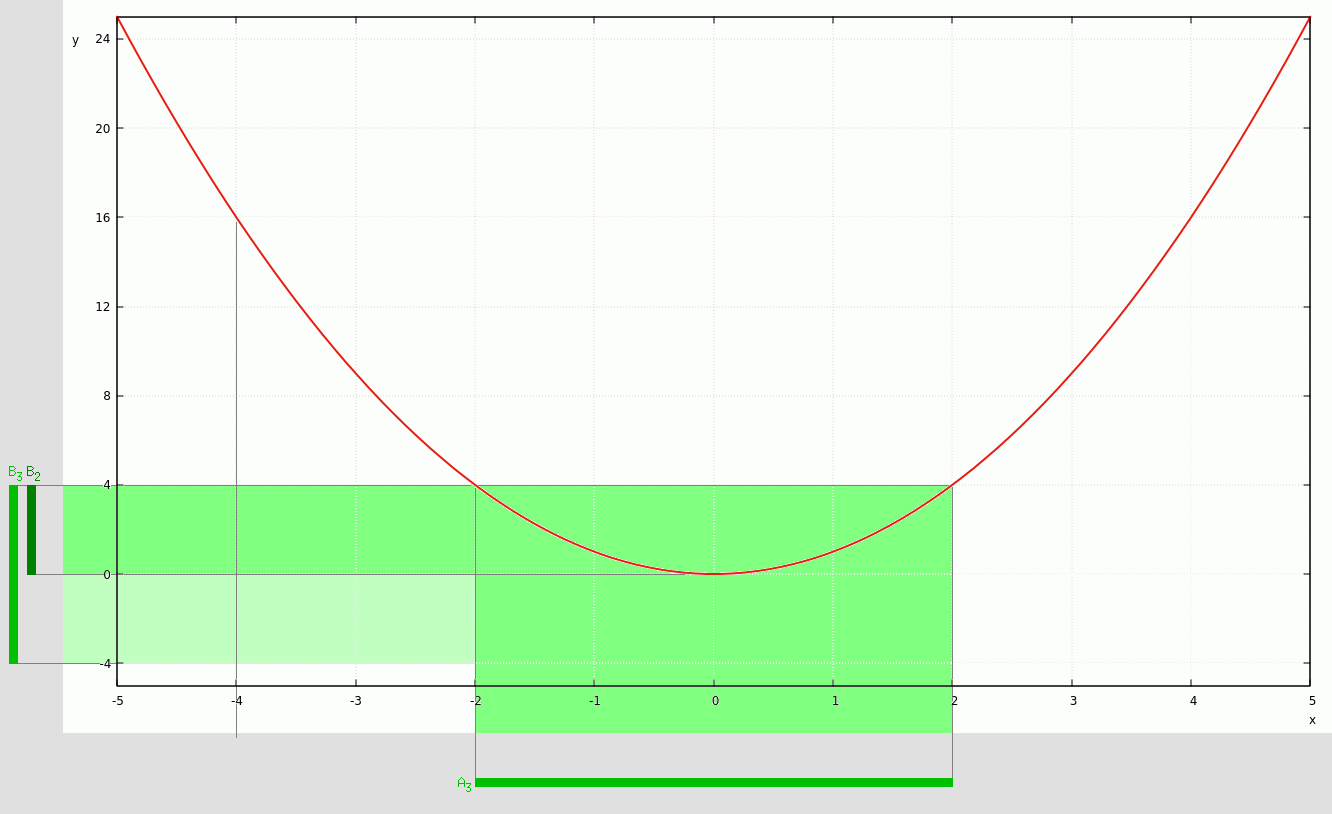
$f\left(f^{-1}\left(B_3\right)\right) \subsetneq B_3.$

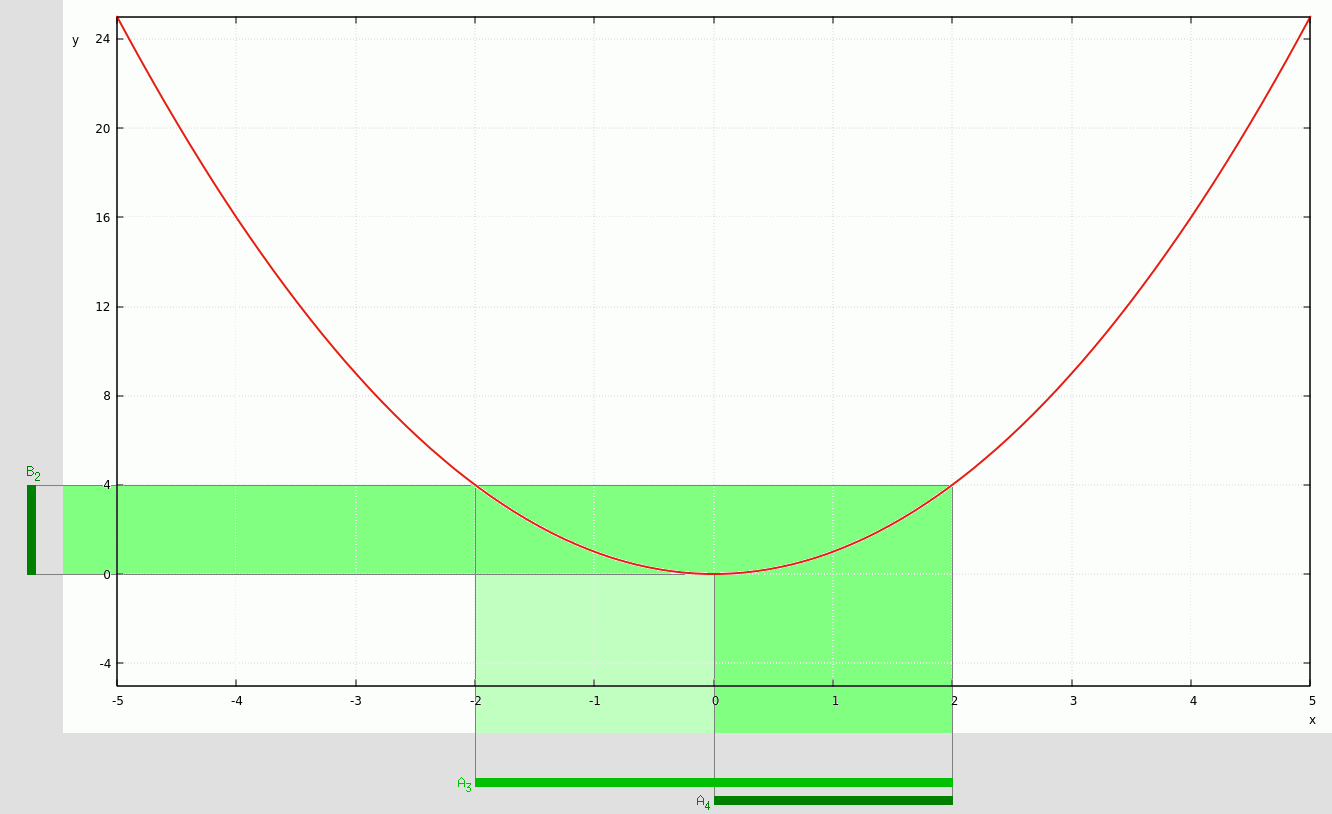
$f^{-1}\left(f\left(A_4\right)\right) \supsetneq A_4.$

=== General ===
For every function $f : X \to Y$ and all subsets $A \subseteq X$ and $B \subseteq Y,$ the following properties hold:

Image	Preimage
$f(X) \subseteq Y$	$f^{-1}(Y) = X$
$f\left(f^{-1}(Y)\right) = f(X)$	$f^{-1}(f(X)) = X$
$f\left(f^{-1}(B)\right) \subseteq B$ (equal if $B \subseteq f(X);$ for instance, if $f$ is surjective)	$f^{-1}(f(A)) \supseteq A$ (equal if $f$ is injective)
$f(f^{-1}(B)) = B \cap f(X)$	$\left(f \vert_A\right)^{-1}(B) = A \cap f^{-1}(B)$
$f\left(f^{-1}(f(A))\right) = f(A)$	$f^{-1}\left(f\left(f^{-1}(B)\right)\right) = f^{-1}(B)$
$f(A) = \varnothing \,\text{ if and only if }\, A = \varnothing$	$f^{-1}(B) = \varnothing \,\text{ if and only if }\, B \subseteq Y \setminus f(X)$
$f(A) \supseteq B \,\text{ if and only if } \text{ there exists } C \subseteq A \text{ such that } f(C) = B$	$f^{-1}(B) \supseteq A \,\text{ if and only if }\, f(A) \subseteq B$
$f(A) \supseteq f(X \setminus A) \,\text{ if and only if }\, f(A) = f(X)$	$f^{-1}(B) \supseteq f^{-1}(Y \setminus B) \,\text{ if and only if }\, f^{-1}(B) = X$
$f(X \setminus A) \supseteq f(X) \setminus f(A)$	$f^{-1}(Y \setminus B) = X \setminus f^{-1}(B)$
$f\left(A \cup f^{-1}(B)\right) \subseteq f(A) \cup B$	$f^{-1}(f(A) \cup B) \supseteq A \cup f^{-1}(B)$
$f\left(A \cap f^{-1}(B)\right) = f(A) \cap B$	$f^{-1}(f(A) \cap B) \supseteq A \cap f^{-1}(B)$

Also:

- $f(A) \cap B = \varnothing \,\text{ if and only if }\, A \cap f^{-1}(B) = \varnothing$

=== Multiple functions ===
For functions $f : X \to Y$ and $g : Y \to Z$ with subsets $A \subseteq X$ and $C \subseteq Z,$ the following properties hold:

- $(g \circ f)(A) = g(f(A))$
- $(g \circ f)^{-1}(C) = f^{-1}(g^{-1}(C))$

=== Multiple subsets of domain or codomain ===
For function $f : X \to Y$ and subsets $A, B \subseteq X$ and $S, T \subseteq Y,$ the following properties hold:

Image	Preimage
$A \subseteq B \,\text{ implies }\, f(A) \subseteq f(B)$	$S \subseteq T \,\text{ implies }\, f^{-1}(S) \subseteq f^{-1}(T)$
$f(A \cup B) = f(A) \cup f(B)$	$f^{-1}(S \cup T) = f^{-1}(S) \cup f^{-1}(T)$
$f(A \cap B) \subseteq f(A) \cap f(B)$ (equal if $f$ is injective)	$f^{-1}(S \cap T) = f^{-1}(S) \cap f^{-1}(T)$
$f(A \setminus B) \supseteq f(A) \setminus f(B)$ (equal if $f$ is injective)	$f^{-1}(S \setminus T) = f^{-1}(S) \setminus f^{-1}(T)$
$f\left(A \triangle B\right) \supseteq f(A) \triangle f(B)$ (equal if $f$ is injective)	$f^{-1}\left(S \triangle T\right) = f^{-1}(S) \triangle f^{-1}(T)$

The results relating images and preimages to the (Boolean) algebra of intersection and union work for any collection of subsets, not just for pairs of subsets:

- $f\left(\bigcup_{s\in S}A_s\right) = \bigcup_{s\in S} f\left(A_s\right)$
- $f\left(\bigcap_{s\in S}A_s\right) \subseteq \bigcap_{s\in S} f\left(A_s\right)$
- $f^{-1}\left(\bigcup_{s\in S}B_s\right) = \bigcup_{s\in S} f^{-1}\left(B_s\right)$
- $f^{-1}\left(\bigcap_{s\in S}B_s\right) = \bigcap_{s\in S} f^{-1}\left(B_s\right)$

(Here, $S$ can be infinite, even uncountably infinite.)

With respect to the algebra of subsets described above, the inverse image function is a lattice homomorphism, while the image function is only a semilattice homomorphism (that is, it does not always preserve intersections).

== See also ==
- Bijection, injection and surjection – Properties of mathematical functions
- Fiber (mathematics) – Class of points in a function's domain defined by having the same image by that map
- Image (category theory)
- Kernel of a function – Equivalence relation expressing that two elements have the same image under a function
- Set inversion – Mathematical problem of finding the set mapped by a specified function to a certain range
- Continuous function – Mathematic property that is often defined by a function's Image and Pre-Image sharing the same openness
