= Map (mathematics) =

Function, homomorphism, or morphism

A map is a function, as in the association of any of the four colored shapes in X to its color in Y.

In mathematics, a map or mapping is synonymous to a function, though various branches add further nuances to differentiate them. The terms may have originated as from the process of making a geographical map: mapping the Earth surface to a sheet of paper.

== Maps and functions ==
The term map may be used to distinguish some special types of functions, such as homomorphisms. For example, a linear map is a homomorphism of vector spaces, while the term linear function may have this meaning or it may mean a linear polynomial. In category theory, a map may refer to a morphism. The term transformation can be used interchangeably, but transformation often refers to a function from a set to itself.

Certain branches will often define a map with a property of particular importance to that branch. For instance, a map is a "continuous function" in topology, a "linear transformation" in linear algebra, etc. Maps of certain kinds have also been given specific names. These include homomorphisms in algebra, isometries in geometry, operators in analysis and representations in group theory.

In the theory of dynamical systems, a map denotes an evolution function used to create discrete dynamical systems.

Some authors, such as Serge Lang, use "function" only to refer to maps in which the codomain is a set of numbers (i.e. a subset of R or C), and reserve the term mapping for more general functions.

== As morphisms ==
In category theory, "map" is often used as a synonym for "morphism" or "arrow", which is a structure-respecting function and thus may imply more structure than "function" does. For example, a morphism $f\colon X \to Y$ in a concrete category (i.e. a morphism that can be viewed as a function) carries with it the information of its domain (the source $X$ of the morphism) and its codomain (the target $Y$). In the widely used definition of a function $f\colon X \to Y$, $f$ is a subset of $X \times Y$ consisting of all the pairs $\big(x, f(x)\big)$ for $x \in X$. In this sense, the function does not capture the set $Y$ that is used as the codomain; only the range $f(X)$ is determined by the function.

== See also ==
- Apply function – Evaluation of a function on its argument
- Arrow notation – e.g., $x \mapsto x + 1$, also known as map
- Bijection, injection and surjection – Properties of mathematical functions
- Homeomorphism – Mapping which preserves all topological properties of a given space
- List of chaotic maps
- Maplet arrow (↦) – commonly pronounced "maps to"
- Mapping class group – Group of isotopy classes of a topological automorphism group
- Permutation group – Group whose operation is composition of permutations
- Regular map (algebraic geometry) – Morphism of algebraic varieties
