= Real-valued function =

Mathematical function that outputs real values

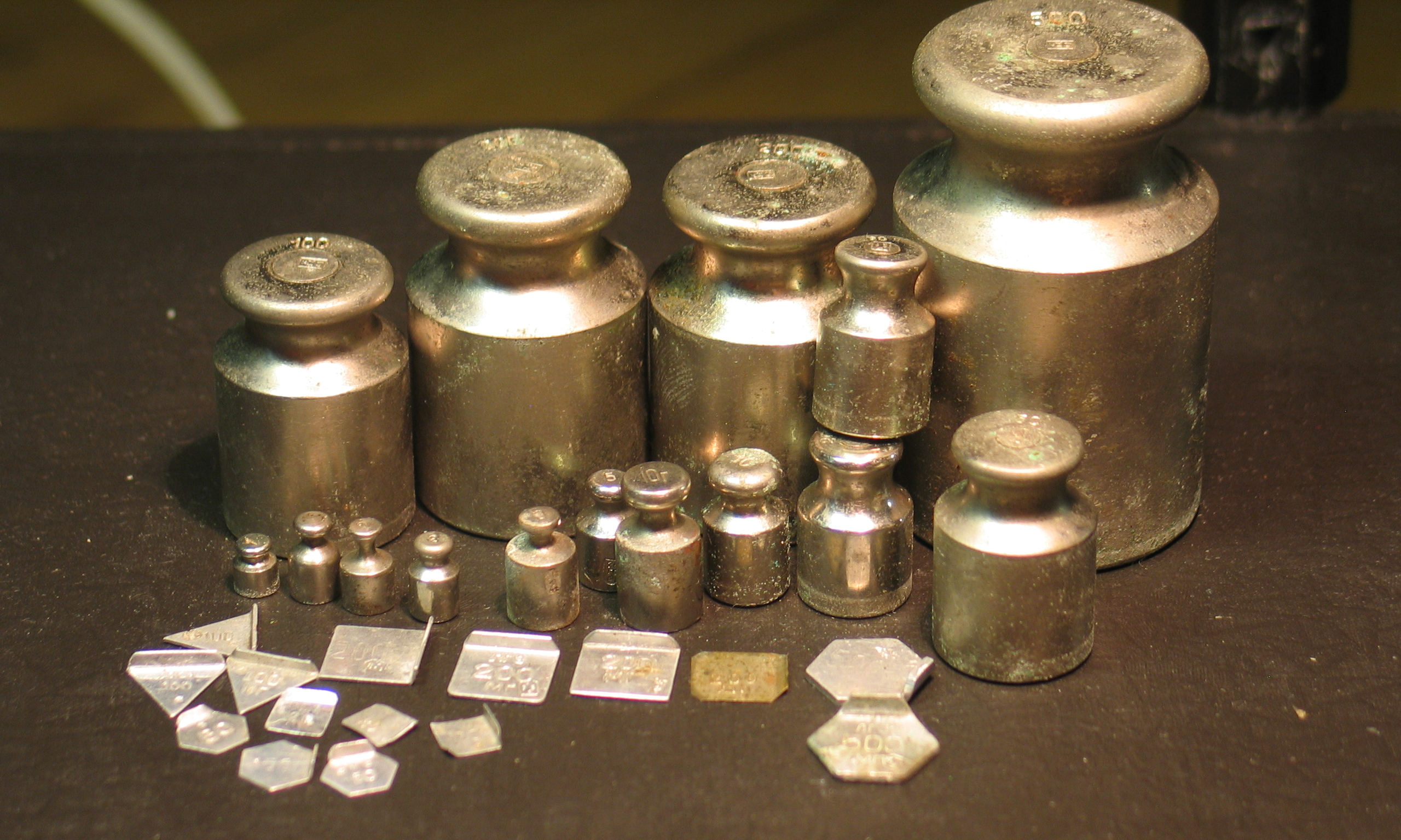
Mass measured in grams is a function from this collection of weight to positive real numbers. The term "weight function", an allusion to this example, is used in pure and applied mathematics.

In mathematics, a real-valued function is a function whose values are real numbers. In other words, it is a function that assigns a real number to each member of its domain.

Real-valued functions of a real variable (commonly called real functions) and real-valued functions of several real variables are the main object of study of calculus and, more generally, real analysis. In particular, many function spaces consist of real-valued functions.

== Algebraic structure ==
Let ${\mathcal F}(X,{\mathbb R})$ be the set of all functions from a set X to real numbers $\mathbb R$. Because $\mathbb R$ is a field, ${\mathcal F}(X,{\mathbb R})$ may be turned into a vector space and a commutative algebra over the reals with the following operations:

- $f+g: x \mapsto f(x) + g(x)$ – vector addition
- $\mathbf{0}: x \mapsto 0$ – additive identity
- $c f: x \mapsto c f(x),\quad c \in \mathbb R$ – scalar multiplication
- $f g: x \mapsto f(x)g(x)$ – pointwise multiplication

These operations extend to partial functions from X to $\mathbb R,$ with the restriction that the partial functions f + g and f g are defined only if the domains of f and g have a nonempty intersection; in this case, their domain is the intersection of the domains of f and g.

Also, since $\mathbb R$ is an ordered set, there is a partial order

- $\ f \le g \quad\iff\quad \forall x: f(x) \le g(x),$

on ${\mathcal F}(X,{\mathbb R}),$ which makes ${\mathcal F}(X,{\mathbb R})$ a partially ordered ring.

== Measurable ==
The σ-algebra of Borel sets is an important structure on real numbers. If X has its σ-algebra and a function f is such that the preimage f ^{−1}(B) of any Borel set B belongs to that σ-algebra, then f is said to be measurable. Measurable functions also form a vector space and an algebra as explained above in § Algebraic structure.

Moreover, a set (family) of real-valued functions on X can actually define a σ-algebra on X generated by all preimages of all Borel sets (or of intervals only, it is not important). This is the way how σ-algebras arise in (Kolmogorov's) probability theory, where real-valued functions on the sample space Ω are real-valued random variables.

== Continuous ==
Real numbers form a topological space and a complete metric space. Continuous real-valued functions (which implies that X is a topological space) are important in theories of topological spaces and of metric spaces. The extreme value theorem states that for any real continuous function on a compact space its global maximum and minimum exist.

The concept of metric space itself is defined with a real-valued function of two variables, the metric, which is continuous. The space of continuous functions on a compact Hausdorff space has a particular importance. Convergent sequences also can be considered as real-valued continuous functions on a special topological space.

Continuous functions also form a vector space and an algebra as explained above in § Algebraic structure, and are a subclass of measurable functions because any topological space has the σ-algebra generated by open (or closed) sets.

== Smooth ==
Real numbers are used as the codomain to define smooth functions. A domain of a real smooth function can be the real coordinate space (which yields a real multivariable function), a topological vector space, an open subset of them, or a smooth manifold.

Spaces of smooth functions also are vector spaces and algebras as explained above in § Algebraic structure and are subspaces of the space of continuous functions.

== Appearances in measure theory ==
A measure on a set is a non-negative real-valued functional on a σ-algebra of subsets. L^{p} spaces on sets with a measure are defined from aforementioned real-valued measurable functions, although they are actually quotient spaces. More precisely, whereas a function satisfying an appropriate summability condition defines an element of L^{p} space, in the opposite direction for any f ∈ L^{p}(X) and x ∈ X which is not an atom, the value f(x) is undefined. Though, real-valued L^{p} spaces still have some of the structure described above in § Algebraic structure. Each of L^{p} spaces is a vector space and have a partial order, and there exists a pointwise multiplication of "functions" which changes p, namely
$$\sdot: L^{1/\alpha} \times L^{1/\beta} \to L^{1/(\alpha+\beta)},\quad
0 \le \alpha,\beta \le 1,\quad\alpha+\beta \le 1.$$
For example, pointwise product of two L^{2} functions belongs to L^{1}.

== Other appearances ==
Other contexts where real-valued functions and their special properties are used include monotonic functions (on ordered sets), convex functions (on vector and affine spaces), harmonic and subharmonic functions (on Riemannian manifolds), analytic functions (usually of one or more real variables), algebraic functions (on real algebraic varieties), and polynomials (of one or more real variables).

== See also ==
- Real analysis
- Partial differential equations — A major user of real-valued functions
- Norm (mathematics)
- Scalar (mathematics)
