= Real variable =

Real variable may refer to:

- A variable taking real values, see Function of a real variable
- A free variable (archaic)
- Real versus nominal value (economics)
