= Volume form =

Differential form

In mathematics, a volume form or top-dimensional form is a differential form of degree equal to the differentiable manifold dimension. Thus on a manifold $M$ of dimension $n$, a volume form is an $n$-form. It is an element of the space of sections of the line bundle $\textstyle{\bigwedge}^n(T^*M)$, denoted as $\Omega^n(M)$. A manifold admits a nowhere-vanishing volume form if and only if it is orientable. An orientable manifold has infinitely many volume forms, since multiplying a volume form by a nowhere-vanishing real valued function yields another volume form. On non-orientable manifolds, one may instead define the weaker notion of a density.

A volume form provides a means to define the integral of a function on a differentiable manifold. In other words, a volume form gives rise to a measure with respect to which functions can be integrated by the appropriate Lebesgue integral. The absolute value of a volume form is a volume element, which is also known variously as a twisted volume form or pseudo-volume form. It also defines a measure, but exists on any differentiable manifold, orientable or not.

Kähler manifolds, being complex manifolds, are naturally oriented, and so possess a volume form. More generally, the $n$th exterior power of the symplectic form on a symplectic manifold is a volume form. Many classes of manifolds have canonical volume forms: they have extra structure which allows the choice of a preferred volume form. Oriented pseudo-Riemannian manifolds have an associated canonical volume form.

== Orientation ==
The following will only be about orientability of differentiable manifolds (it's a more general notion defined on any topological manifold).

A manifold is orientable if it has a coordinate atlas all of whose transition functions have positive Jacobian determinants. A selection of a maximal such atlas is an orientation on $M.$ A volume form $\omega$ on $M$ gives rise to an orientation in a natural way as the atlas of coordinate charts on $M$ that send $\omega$ to a positive multiple of the Euclidean volume form $dx^1 \wedge \cdots \wedge dx^n.$

A volume form also allows for the specification of a preferred class of frames on $M.$ Call a basis of tangent vectors $(X_1, \ldots, X_n)$ right-handed if
$$\omega\left(X_1, X_2, \ldots, X_n\right) > 0.$$

The collection of all right-handed frames is acted upon by the group $\mathrm{GL}^+(n)$ of general linear mappings in $n$ dimensions with positive determinant. They form a principal $\mathrm{GL}^+(n)$ sub-bundle of the linear frame bundle of $M,$ and so the orientation associated to a volume form gives a canonical reduction of the frame bundle of $M$ to a sub-bundle with structure group $\mathrm{GL}^+(n).$ That is to say that a volume form gives rise to $\mathrm{GL}^+(n)$-structure on $M.$ More reduction is clearly possible by considering frames that have

$\omega\left(X_1, X_2, \ldots, X_n\right) = 1.$	1

Thus a volume form gives rise to an $\mathrm{SL}(n)$-structure as well. Conversely, given an $\mathrm{SL}(n)$-structure, one can recover a volume form by imposing (1) for the special linear frames and then solving for the required $n$-form $\omega$ by requiring homogeneity in its arguments.

A manifold is orientable if and only if it has a nowhere-vanishing volume form. Indeed, $\mathrm{SL}(n) \to \mathrm{GL}^+(n)$ is a deformation retract since $\mathrm{GL}^+ = \mathrm{SL} \times \R^+,$ where the positive reals are embedded as scalar matrices. Thus every $\mathrm{GL}^+(n)$-structure is reducible to an $\mathrm{SL}(n)$-structure, and $\mathrm{GL}^+(n)$-structures coincide with orientations on $M.$ More concretely, triviality of the determinant bundle $\Omega^n(M)$ is equivalent to orientability, and a line bundle is trivial if and only if it has a nowhere-vanishing section. Thus, the existence of a volume form is equivalent to orientability.

== Relation to measures ==
Given a volume form $\omega$ on an oriented manifold, the density $|\omega|$ is a volume pseudo-form on the nonoriented manifold obtained by forgetting the orientation. Densities may also be defined more generally on non-orientable manifolds.

Any volume pseudo-form $\omega$ (and therefore also any volume form) defines a measure on the Borel sets by
$$\mu_\omega(U) = \int_U\omega .$$

The difference is that while a measure can be integrated over a (Borel) subset, a volume form can only be integrated over an oriented cell. In single variable calculus, writing $\int_b^a f\,dx = -\int_a^b f\,dx$ considers $dx$ as a volume form, not simply a measure, and $\int_b^a$ indicates "integrate over the cell $[a,b]$ with the opposite orientation, sometimes denoted $\overline{[a, b]}$".

Further, general measures need not be continuous or smooth: they need not be defined by a volume form, or more formally, their Radon–Nikodym derivative with respect to a given volume form need not be absolutely continuous.

== Divergence ==
Given a volume form $\omega$ on $M,$ one can define the divergence of a vector field $X$ as the unique scalar-valued function, denoted by $\operatorname{div} X,$ satisfying
$$(\operatorname{div} X)\omega = L_X\omega = d(X \mathbin{\!\rfloor} \omega) ,$$
where $L_X$ denotes the Lie derivative along $X$ and $X \mathbin{\!\rfloor} \omega$ denotes the interior product or the left contraction of $\omega$ along $X.$ If $X$ is a compactly supported vector field and $M$ is a manifold with boundary, then Stokes' theorem implies
$$\int_M (\operatorname{div} X)\omega = \int_{\partial M} X \mathbin{\!\rfloor} \omega,$$
which is a generalization of the divergence theorem.

The solenoidal vector fields are those with $\operatorname{div} X = 0.$ It follows from the definition of the Lie derivative that the volume form is preserved under the flow of a solenoidal vector field. Thus solenoidal vector fields are precisely those that have volume-preserving flows. This fact is well-known, for instance, in fluid mechanics where the divergence of a velocity field measures the compressibility of a fluid, which in turn represents the extent to which volume is preserved along flows of the fluid.

== Special cases ==
=== Lie groups ===
For any Lie group, a natural volume form may be defined by translation. That is, if $\omega_e$ is an element of ${\textstyle\bigwedge}^n T_e^*G,$ then a left-invariant form may be defined by $\omega_g = L_{g^{-1}}^*\omega_e,$ where $L_g$ is left-translation. As a corollary, every Lie group is orientable. This volume form is unique up to a scalar, and the corresponding measure is known as the Haar measure.

=== Symplectic manifolds ===
Any symplectic manifold (or indeed any almost symplectic manifold) has a natural volume form. If $M$ is a $2 n$-dimensional manifold with symplectic form $\omega,$ then $\omega^n$ is nowhere zero as a consequence of the nondegeneracy of the symplectic form. As a corollary, any symplectic manifold is orientable (indeed, oriented). If the manifold is both symplectic and Riemannian, then the two volume forms agree if the manifold is Kähler.

=== Riemannian volume form ===
Any oriented pseudo-Riemannian (including Riemannian) manifold has a natural volume form. In local coordinates, it can be expressed as
$$\omega = \sqrt{|g|} dx^1\wedge \dots \wedge dx^n$$
where the $dx^i$ are 1-forms that form a positively oriented basis for the cotangent bundle of the manifold. Here, $|g|$ is the absolute value of the determinant of the matrix representation of the metric tensor on the manifold.

The volume form is denoted variously by
$$\omega = \mathrm{vol}_n = \varepsilon = {\star}(1).$$

Here, the ${\star}$ is the Hodge star, thus the last form, ${\star} (1),$ emphasizes that the volume form is the Hodge dual of the constant map on the manifold, which equals the Levi-Civita tensor $\varepsilon.$

Although the Greek letter $\omega$ is frequently used to denote the volume form, this notation is not universal; the symbol $\omega$ often carries many other meanings in differential geometry (such as a symplectic form).

== Invariants of a volume form ==
Volume forms are not unique; they form a torsor over non-vanishing functions on the manifold, as follows. Given a non-vanishing function $f$ on $M,$ and a volume form $\omega,$ $f\omega$ is a volume form on $M.$ Conversely, given two volume forms $\omega, \omega',$ their ratio is a non-vanishing function (positive if they define the same orientation, negative if they define opposite orientations).

In coordinates, they are both simply a non-zero function times Lebesgue measure, and their ratio is the ratio of the functions, which is independent of choice of coordinates. Intrinsically, it is the Radon–Nikodym derivative of $\omega'$ with respect to $\omega.$ On an oriented manifold, the proportionality of any two volume forms can be thought of as a geometric form of the Radon–Nikodym theorem.

=== No local structure ===
A volume form on a manifold has no local structure in the sense that it is not possible on small open sets to distinguish between the given volume form and the volume form on Euclidean space (Kobayashi 1972). That is, for every point $p$ in $M,$ there is an open neighborhood $U$ of $p$ and a diffeomorphism $\varphi$ of $U$ onto an open set in $\R^n$ such that the volume form on $U$ is the pullback of $dx^1\wedge\cdots\wedge dx^n$ along $\varphi.$

As a corollary, if $M$ and $N$ are two manifolds, each with volume forms $\omega_M, \omega_N,$ then for any points $m \in M, n \in N,$ there are open neighborhoods $U$ of $m$ and $V$ of $n$ and a map $f : U \to V$ such that the volume form on $N$ restricted to the neighborhood $V$ pulls back to volume form on $M$ restricted to the neighborhood $U$: $f^*\omega_N\vert_V = \omega_M\vert_U.$

In one dimension, one can prove it thus: given a volume form $\omega$ on $\R,$ define
$$f(x) := \int_0^x \omega.$$
Then the standard Lebesgue measure $dx$ pulls back to $\omega$ under $f$: $\omega = f^*dx.$ Concretely, $\omega = f'\,dx.$ In higher dimensions, given any point $m \in M,$ it has a neighborhood locally homeomorphic to $\R\times\R^{n-1},$ and one can apply the same procedure.

=== Global structure: volume ===
A volume form on a connected manifold $M$ has a single global invariant, namely the (overall) volume, denoted $\mu(M),$ which is invariant under volume-form preserving maps; this may be infinite, such as for Lebesgue measure on $\R^n.$ On a disconnected manifold, the volume of each connected component is the invariant.

In symbols, if $f : M \to N$ is a diffeomorphism of manifolds that pulls back $\omega_N$ to $\omega_M,$ then
$$\mu(N) = \int_N \omega_N = \int_{f(M)} \omega_N = \int_M f^*\omega_N = \int_M \omega_M = \mu(M)\,$$
and the manifolds have the same volume.

Volume forms can also be pulled back under covering maps, in which case they multiply volume by the cardinality of the fiber (formally, by integration along the fiber). In the case of an infinite sheeted cover (such as $\R \to S^1$), a volume form on a finite volume manifold pulls back to a volume form on an infinite volume manifold.

== See also ==
- Cylindrical coordinate system § Line and volume elements
- Measure (mathematics) – Generalization of mass, length, area and volume
- Poincaré metric provides a review of the volume form on the complex plane
- Spherical coordinate system § Integration and differentiation in spherical coordinates
