= Pseudotensor =

Type of physical quantity

In physics and mathematics, a pseudotensor is usually a quantity that transforms like a tensor under an orientation-preserving coordinate transformation (e.g. a proper rotation) but additionally changes sign under an orientation-reversing coordinate transformation (e.g., an improper rotation), which is a transformation that can be expressed as a proper rotation followed by reflection. This is a generalization of a pseudovector. To evaluate a tensor or pseudotensor sign, it has to be contracted with some vectors, as many as its rank is, belonging to the space where the rotation is made while keeping the tensor coordinates unaffected (differently from what one does in the case of a base change). Under improper rotation a pseudotensor and a proper tensor of the same rank will have different sign which depends on the rank being even or odd. Sometimes inversion of the axes is used as an example of an improper rotation to see the behaviour of a pseudotensor, but it works only if vector space dimensions is odd otherwise inversion is a proper rotation without an additional reflection.

There is a second meaning for pseudotensor (and likewise for pseudovector), restricted to general relativity. Tensors obey strict transformation laws, but pseudotensors in this sense are not so constrained. Consequently, the form of a pseudotensor will, in general, change as the frame of reference is altered. An equation containing pseudotensors, such as stress–energy–momentum pseudotensors, which holds in one frame will not necessarily hold in a different frame. This makes pseudotensors of limited relevance because equations in which they appear are not invariant in form.

Mathematical developments in the 1980s have allowed pseudotensors to be understood as sections of jet bundles.

== Definition ==
Two quite different mathematical objects are called a pseudotensor in different contexts.

The first context is essentially a tensor multiplied by an extra sign factor, such that the pseudotensor changes sign under reflections when a normal tensor does not. According to one definition, a pseudotensor P of the type $(p, q)$ is a geometric object whose components in an arbitrary basis are enumerated by $(p + q)$ indices and obey the transformation rule
$$\hat{P}^{i_1\ldots i_q}_{\quad j_1\ldots j_p} =
(-1)^A A^{i_1} {}_{k_1}\cdots A^{i_q} {}_{k_q}
B^{l_1} {}_{j_1}\cdots B^{l_p} {}_{j_p}
P^{k_1\ldots k_q}_{\quad l_1\ldots l_p}$$
under a change of basis. Here $\hat{P}^{i_1 \ldots i_q}_{\quad j_1 \ldots j_p}, P^{k_1 \ldots k_q}_{\quad l_1 \ldots l_p}$ are the components of the pseudotensor in the new and old bases, respectively, A $= [A^{i} {}_{k}]$ is the transition matrix for the contravariant (upper) indices, B is the transition matrix for the covariant (lower) indices, and $(-1)^A = \mathrm{sign}\left(\det {\mathbf{A}}\right).$ This transformation rule differs from the rule for an ordinary tensor only by the presence of the factor $(-1)^A.$ If the transformation preserves the orientation of the basis (e.g., an ordinary rotation), $(-1)^A = +1$, otherwise $= -1$.

The second context where the word "pseudotensor" is used is general relativity. In that theory, one cannot describe the energy and momentum of the gravitational field by an energy–momentum tensor. Instead, one introduces objects that behave as tensors only with respect to restricted coordinate transformations. Strictly speaking, such objects are not tensors at all. A famous example of such a pseudotensor is the Landau–Lifshitz pseudotensor.

== Examples ==
On non-orientable manifolds, one cannot define a volume form globally due to the non-orientability, but one can define a volume element, which is formally a density, and may also be called a pseudo-volume form, due to the additional sign twist (tensoring with the sign bundle). The volume element is a pseudotensor density according to the first definition.

A change of variables in multi-dimensional integration may be achieved through the incorporation of a factor of the absolute value of the determinant of the Jacobian matrix. The use of the absolute value introduces a sign change for improper coordinate transformations to compensate for the convention of keeping integration (volume) element positive; as such, an integrand is an example of a pseudotensor density according to the first definition.

The Christoffel symbols of an affine connection on a manifold can be thought of as the correction terms to the partial derivatives of a coordinate expression of a vector field with respect to the coordinates to render it the vector field's covariant derivative. While the affine connection itself doesn't depend on the choice of coordinates, its Christoffel symbols do, making them a pseudotensor quantity according to the second definition.

== See also ==
- Action (physics) – Physical quantity of dimension energy × time
- Conservation law – Scientific law regarding conservation of a physical property
- General relativity – Theory of gravitation as curved spacetime
- Tensor – Algebraic object with geometric applications
- Tensor density – Generalization of tensor fields
- Tensor field – Assignment of a tensor continuously varying across a region of space
- Noether's theorem – Statement relating differentiable symmetries to conserved quantities
- Pseudovector – Physical quantity that changes sign with improper rotation
- Variational principle – Scientific principles enabling the use of the calculus of variations
