= Levi-Civita symbol =

Antisymmetric permutation object acting on tensors

In mathematics, particularly in linear algebra, tensor analysis, and differential geometry, the Levi-Civita symbol or Levi-Civita epsilon represents a collection of numbers defined from the sign of a permutation of the natural numbers 1, 2, ..., n, for some positive integer n. It is named after the Italian mathematician and physicist Tullio Levi-Civita. Other names include the permutation symbol, antisymmetric symbol, or alternating symbol, which refer to its antisymmetric property and definition in terms of permutations.

The standard letters to denote the Levi-Civita symbol are the Greek lower case epsilon ε or ϵ, or less commonly the Latin lower case e. Index notation allows one to display permutations in a way compatible with tensor analysis:
$$\varepsilon_{i_1 i_2 \dots i_n}$$
where each index i_{1}, i_{2}, ..., i_{n} takes values 1, 2, ..., n. There are n^{n} indexed values of ε_{i_{1}i_{2}...i_{n}}, which can be arranged into an n-dimensional array. The key defining property of the symbol is total antisymmetry in the indices. When any two indices are interchanged, equal or not, the symbol is negated:
$$\varepsilon_{\dots i_p \dots i_q \dots } = -\varepsilon_{\dots i_q \dots i_p \dots } .$$

If any two indices are equal, the symbol is zero. When all indices are unequal, we have:
$$\varepsilon_{i_1 i_2 \dots i_n} = (-1)^p \varepsilon_{1 \, 2 \, \dots n} ,$$
where p (called the parity of the permutation) is the number of pairwise interchanges of indices necessary to unscramble i_{1}, i_{2}, ..., i_{n} into the order 1, 2, ..., n, and the factor (−1)^{p} is called the sign, or signature of the permutation. The value ε_{1 2 ... n} must be defined, else the particular values of the symbol for all permutations are indeterminate. Most authors choose ε_{1 2 ... n} = +1, which means the Levi-Civita symbol equals the sign of a permutation when the indices are all unequal. This choice is used throughout this article.

The term "n-dimensional Levi-Civita symbol" refers to the fact that the number of indices on the symbol n matches the dimensionality of the vector space in question, which may be Euclidean or non-Euclidean, for example, $\mathbb{R}^3$ or Minkowski space. The values of the Levi-Civita symbol are independent of any metric tensor and coordinate system. Also, the specific term "symbol" emphasizes that it is not a tensor because of how it transforms between coordinate systems; however it can be interpreted as a tensor density.

The Levi-Civita symbol allows the determinant of a square matrix, and the cross product of two vectors in three-dimensional Euclidean space, to be expressed in Einstein index notation.

== Definition ==
The Levi-Civita symbol is most often used in three and four dimensions, and to some extent in two dimensions, so these are given here before defining the general case.

=== Two dimensions ===
In two dimensions, the Levi-Civita symbol is defined by:
$$\varepsilon_{ij} =
\begin{cases}
+1       & \text{if } (i, j) = (1, 2) \\
-1       & \text{if } (i, j) = (2, 1) \\
\;\;\,0 & \text{if } i = j
\end{cases}$$
The values can be arranged into a 2 × 2 antisymmetric matrix:
$$\begin{pmatrix}
\varepsilon_{11} & \varepsilon_{12} \\
\varepsilon_{21} & \varepsilon_{22}
\end{pmatrix} = \begin{pmatrix}
0 & 1 \\
-1 & 0
\end{pmatrix}$$

Use of the two-dimensional symbol is common in condensed matter, and in certain specialized high-energy topics like supersymmetry and twistor theory, where it appears in the context of 2-spinors.

=== Three dimensions ===
For the indices (i, j, k) in ε_{ijk}, the values 1, 2, 3 occurring in the cyclic order (1, 2, 3) correspond to ε = +1, while occurring in the reverse cyclic order correspond to ε = −1, otherwise ε = 0.

In three dimensions, the Levi-Civita symbol is defined by:
$$\varepsilon_{ijk} = \begin{cases}
+1 & \text{if } (i,j,k) \text{ is } (1,2,3), (2,3,1), \text{ or } (3,1,2), \\
-1 & \text{if } (i,j,k) \text{ is } (3,2,1), (1,3,2), \text{ or } (2,1,3), \\
\;\;\,0 & \text{if } i = j, \text{ or } j = k, \text{ or } k = i
\end{cases}$$

That is, ε_{ijk} is 1 if (i, j, k) is an even permutation of (1, 2, 3), −1 if it is an odd permutation, and 0 if any index is repeated. In three dimensions only, the cyclic permutations of (1, 2, 3) are all even permutations, similarly the anticyclic permutations are all odd permutations. This means in 3d it is sufficient to take cyclic or anticyclic permutations of (1, 2, 3) and easily obtain all the even or odd permutations.

Analogous to 2-dimensional matrices, the values of the 3-dimensional Levi-Civita symbol can be arranged into a 3 × 3 × 3 array:

where i is the depth (blue: i = 1; red: i = 2; green: i = 3), j is the row and k is the column.

Some examples:
$$\begin{align}
\varepsilon_{\color{BrickRed}{1}  \color{Violet}{3}  \color{Orange}{2}} = -\varepsilon_{\color{BrickRed}{1}  \color{Orange}{2} \color{Violet}{3}} &= - 1 \\
\varepsilon_{  \color{Violet}{3} \color{BrickRed}{1}  \color{Orange}{2}} = -\varepsilon_{  \color{Orange}{2} \color{BrickRed}{1} \color{Violet}{3}} &= -(-\varepsilon_{\color{BrickRed}{1} \color{Orange}{2} \color{Violet}{3}}) = 1 \\
\varepsilon_{  \color{Orange}{2}  \color{Violet}{3} \color{BrickRed}{1}} = -\varepsilon_{\color{BrickRed}{1} \color{Violet}{3} \color{Orange}{2}} &= -(-\varepsilon_{\color{BrickRed}{1} \color{Orange}{2} \color{Violet}{3}}) = 1 \\
\varepsilon_{  \color{Orange}{2}  \color{Violet}{3}  \color{Orange}{2}} = -\varepsilon_{  \color{Orange}{2}  \color{Violet}{3} \color{Orange}{2}} &= 0
\end{align}$$

=== Four dimensions ===
In four dimensions, the Levi-Civita symbol is defined by:
$$\varepsilon_{ijkl} = \begin{cases}
+1 & \text{if }(i,j,k,l) \text{ is an even permutation of } (1,2,3,4) \\
-1 & \text{if }(i,j,k,l) \text{ is an odd permutation of } (1,2,3,4) \\
\;\;\,0 & \text{otherwise}
\end{cases}$$

These values can be arranged into a 4 × 4 × 4 × 4 array, although in 4 dimensions and higher this is difficult to draw.

Some examples:
$$\begin{align}
\varepsilon_{\color{BrickRed}{1} \color{RedViolet}{4}\color{Violet}{3} \color{Orange}{\color{Orange}{2}}} = -\varepsilon_{\color{BrickRed}{1} \color{Orange}{\color{Orange}{2}} \color{Violet}{3} \color{RedViolet}{4}} &= - 1\\
\varepsilon_{\color{Orange}{\color{Orange}{2}} \color{BrickRed}{1} \color{Violet}{3} \color{RedViolet}{4}} = -\varepsilon_{\color{BrickRed}{1} \color{Orange}{\color{Orange}{2}} \color{Violet}{3} \color{RedViolet}{4}} &= -1\\
\varepsilon_{\color{RedViolet}{4} \color{Violet}{3} \color{Orange}{\color{Orange}{2}} \color{BrickRed}{1}} = -\varepsilon_{\color{BrickRed}{1} \color{Violet}{3} \color{Orange}{\color{Orange}{2}} \color{RedViolet}{4}} &= -(-\varepsilon_{\color{BrickRed}{1} \color{Orange}{\color{Orange}{2}} \color{Violet}{3} \color{RedViolet}{4}}) = 1\\
\varepsilon_{\color{Violet}{3} \color{Orange}{\color{Orange}{2}} \color{RedViolet}{4} \color{Violet}{3}} = -\varepsilon_{\color{Violet}{3} \color{Orange}{\color{Orange}{2}} \color{RedViolet}{4}\color{Violet}{3}} &= 0
\end{align}$$

=== Generalization to n dimensions ===
More generally, in n dimensions, the Levi-Civita symbol is defined by:
$$\varepsilon_{a_1 a_2 a_3 \ldots a_n} = \begin{cases}
+1 & \text{if }(a_1, a_2, a_3, \ldots, a_n) \text{ is an even permutation of } (1, 2, 3, \dots, n) \\
-1 & \text{if }(a_1, a_2, a_3, \ldots, a_n) \text{ is an odd permutation of } (1, 2, 3, \dots, n) \\
\;\;\,0 & \text{otherwise}
\end{cases}$$

Thus, it is the sign of the permutation in the case of a permutation, and zero otherwise.

Using the capital pi notation Π for ordinary multiplication of numbers, an explicit expression for the symbol is:
$$\begin{align}
\varepsilon_{a_1 a_2 a_3 \ldots a_n}
& = \prod_{1 \leq i < j \leq n} \sgn (a_j - a_i) \\
& = \sgn(a_2 - a_1) \sgn(a_3 - a_1) \dotsm \sgn(a_n - a_1) \sgn(a_3 - a_2) \sgn(a_4 - a_2) \dotsm \sgn(a_n - a_2) \dotsm \sgn(a_n - a_{n-1})
\end{align}$$
where the signum function (denoted sgn) returns the sign of its argument while discarding the absolute value if nonzero. The formula is valid for all index values, and for any n (when n = 0 or n = 1, this is the empty product). However, computing the formula above naively has a time complexity of O(n^{2}), whereas the sign can be computed from the parity of the permutation from its disjoint cycles in only O(n log(n)) cost.

== Properties ==
A tensor whose components in an orthonormal basis are given by the Levi-Civita symbol (a tensor of covariant rank n) is sometimes called a permutation tensor.

Under the ordinary transformation rules for tensors the Levi-Civita symbol is unchanged under pure rotations, consistent with that it is (by definition) the same in all coordinate systems related by orthogonal transformations. However, the Levi-Civita symbol is a pseudotensor because under an orthogonal transformation of Jacobian determinant −1, for example, a reflection in an odd number of dimensions, it should acquire a minus sign if it were a tensor. As it does not change at all, the Levi-Civita symbol is, by definition, a pseudotensor.

As the Levi-Civita symbol is a pseudotensor, the result of taking a cross product is a pseudovector, not a vector.

Under a general coordinate change, the components of the permutation tensor are multiplied by the Jacobian of the transformation matrix. This implies that in coordinate frames different from the one in which the tensor was defined, its components can differ from those of the Levi-Civita symbol by an overall factor. If the frame is orthonormal, the factor will be ±1 depending on whether the orientation of the frame is the same or not.

In index-free tensor notation, the Levi-Civita symbol is replaced by the concept of the Hodge dual.

Summation symbols can be eliminated by using Einstein notation, where an index repeated between two or more terms indicates summation over that index. For example,

$$\varepsilon_{ijk} \varepsilon^{imn} \equiv \sum_{i=1,2,3} \varepsilon_{ijk} \varepsilon^{imn}$$.

In the following examples, Einstein notation is used.

=== Two dimensions ===
In two dimensions, when all i, j, m, n each take the values 1 and 2:

$\varepsilon_{ij} \varepsilon^{mn} = {\delta_i}^m {\delta_j}^n - {\delta_i}^n {\delta_j}^m$	1

$\varepsilon_{ij} \varepsilon^{in} = {\delta_j}^n$	2

$\varepsilon_{ij} \varepsilon^{ij} = 2.$	3

=== Three dimensions ===
==== Index and symbol values ====
In three dimensions, when all i, j, k, m, n, p,q each take values 1, 2, and 3:

$\varepsilon_{ijk} \varepsilon^{pqk}=\delta_i{}^{p}\delta_j{}^q - \delta_i{}^q\delta_j{}^p$	4

$\varepsilon_{jmn} \varepsilon^{imn}=2{\delta_j}^i$	5

$\varepsilon_{ijk} \varepsilon^{ijk}=6.$	6

==== Product ====
The Levi-Civita symbol is related to the Kronecker delta. In three dimensions, the relationship is given by the following equations (vertical lines denote the determinant):

$$\begin{align}
\varepsilon_{ijk}\varepsilon_{lmn} &= \begin{vmatrix}
\delta_{il} & \delta_{im} & \delta_{in} \\
\delta_{jl} & \delta_{jm} & \delta_{jn} \\
\delta_{kl} & \delta_{km} & \delta_{kn} \\
\end{vmatrix} \\[6pt]
&= \delta_{il}\left( \delta_{jm}\delta_{kn} - \delta_{jn}\delta_{km}\right) - \delta_{im}\left( \delta_{jl}\delta_{kn} - \delta_{jn}\delta_{kl} \right) + \delta_{in} \left( \delta_{jl}\delta_{km} - \delta_{jm}\delta_{kl} \right).
\end{align}$$

A special case of this result occurs when one of the indices is repeated and summed over:

$$\sum_{i=1}^3 \varepsilon_{ijk}\varepsilon_{imn} = \delta_{jm}\delta_{kn} - \delta_{jn}\delta_{km}$$

In Einstein notation, the duplication of the i index implies the sum on i. The previous is then denoted ε_{ijk}ε_{imn} = δ_{jm}δ_{kn} − δ_{jn}δ_{km}.

If two indices are repeated (and summed over), this further reduces to:

$$\sum_{i=1}^3 \sum_{j=1}^3 \varepsilon_{ijk}\varepsilon_{ijn} = 2\delta_{kn}$$

=== n dimensions ===
==== Index and symbol values ====
In n dimensions, when all i_{1}, ...,i_{n}, j_{1}, ..., j_{n} take values 1, 2, ..., n:

$\varepsilon_{i_1 \dots i_n} \varepsilon^{j_1 \dots j_n} = \delta^{j_1 \dots j_n}_{i_1 \dots i_n}$	7

$\varepsilon_{i_1 \dots i_k~i_{k+1} \dots i_n} \varepsilon^{i_1 \dots i_k~j_{k+1} \dots j_n} = \delta_{ i_1 \ldots i_k~i_{k+1} \ldots i_n}^{i_1 \dots i_k~j_{k+1}\ldots j_n} = k!~\delta^{j_{k+1} \dots j_n}_{i_{k+1} \dots i_n}$	8

$\varepsilon_{i_1 \dots i_n}\varepsilon^{i_1 \dots i_n} = n!$	9

where the exclamation mark (!) denotes the factorial, and δ^{α...}_{β...} is the generalized Kronecker delta. For any n, the property

$$\sum_{i, j, k, \dots = 1}^n \varepsilon_{ijk\dots}\varepsilon_{ijk\dots} = n!$$

follows from the facts that

- every permutation is either even or odd,
- (+1)^{2} = (−1)^{2} = 1, and
- the number of permutations of any n-element set number is exactly n!.

The particular case of (8) with $k=n-2$ is
$$\varepsilon_{i_1\dots i_{n-2}jk}\varepsilon^{i_1\dots i_{n-2}lm} = (n-2)!(\delta_j^l\delta_k^m - \delta_j^m\delta^l_k)\,.$$

==== Product ====
In general, for n dimensions, one can write the product of two Levi-Civita symbols as:
$$\varepsilon_{i_1 i_2 \dots i_n} \varepsilon_{j_1 j_2 \dots j_n} = \begin{vmatrix}
\delta_{i_1 j_1} & \delta_{i_1 j_2} & \dots  & \delta_{i_1 j_n} \\
\delta_{i_2 j_1} & \delta_{i_2 j_2} & \dots  & \delta_{i_2 j_n} \\
\vdots           & \vdots           & \ddots & \vdots \\
\delta_{i_n j_1} & \delta_{i_n j_2} & \dots  & \delta_{i_n j_n} \\
\end{vmatrix}.$$
Proof: Both sides change signs upon switching two indices, so without loss of generality assume $i_1 \leq \cdots\leq i_n, j_1 \leq \cdots \leq j_n$. If some $i_c = i_{c+1}$ then left side is zero, and right side is also zero since two of its rows are equal. Similarly for $j_c = j_{c+1}$. Finally, if $i_1 < \cdots < i_n, j_1 < \cdots < j_n$, then both sides are 1.

=== Proofs ===
For (1), both sides are antisymmetric with respect of ij and mn. We therefore only need to consider the case i ≠ j and m ≠ n. By substitution, we see that the equation holds for ε_{12}ε^{12}, that is, for i = m = 1 and j = n = 2. (Both sides are then one). Since the equation is antisymmetric in ij and mn, any set of values for these can be reduced to the above case (which holds). The equation thus holds for all values of ij and mn.

Using (1), we have for (2)

$$\varepsilon_{ij} \varepsilon^{in} = \delta_i{}^i \delta_j{}^n - \delta_i{}^n \delta_j{}^i = 2 \delta_j{}^n - \delta_j{}^n = \delta_j{}^n \,.$$

Here we used the Einstein summation convention with i going from 1 to 2. Next, (3) follows similarly from (2).

To establish (5), notice that both sides vanish when i ≠ j. Indeed, if i ≠ j, then one can not choose m and n such that both permutation symbols on the left are nonzero. Then, with i = j fixed, there are only two ways to choose m and n from the remaining two indices. For any such indices, we have

$$\varepsilon_{jmn} \varepsilon^{imn} = \left(\varepsilon^{imn}\right)^2 = 1$$

(no summation), and the result follows.

Then (6) follows since 3! = 6 and for any distinct indices i, j, k taking values 1, 2, 3, we have

$\varepsilon_{ijk} \varepsilon^{ijk} = 1$ (no summation, distinct i, j, k)

== Applications and examples ==
=== Determinants ===
In linear algebra, the determinant of a 3 × 3 square matrix A = [a_{ij}] can be written

$$\det(\mathbf{A}) = \sum_{i=1}^3 \sum_{j=1}^3 \sum_{k=1}^3 \varepsilon_{ijk} a_{1i} a_{2j} a_{3k}$$

Similarly the determinant of an n × n matrix A = [a_{ij}] can be written as

$$\det(\mathbf{A}) = \varepsilon_{i_1\dots i_n} a_{1i_1} \dots a_{ni_n},$$

where each i_{r} should be summed over 1, ..., n, or equivalently:

$$\det(\mathbf{A}) = \frac{1}{n!} \varepsilon_{i_1\dots i_n} \varepsilon_{j_1\dots j_n} a_{i_1 j_1} \dots a_{i_n j_n},$$

where now each i_{r} and each j_{r} should be summed over 1, ..., n. More generally, we have the identity

$$\sum_{i_1,i_2,\dots}\varepsilon_{i_1\dots i_n} a_{i_1 \, j_1} \dots a_{i_n \, j_n} = \det(\mathbf{A}) \varepsilon_{j_1\dots j_n}$$

=== Vector cross product ===
==== Cross product (two vectors) ====
Let $(\mathbf{e_1}, \mathbf{e_2}, \mathbf{e_3})$ a positively oriented orthonormal basis of a vector space. If (a^{1}, a^{2}, a^{3}) and (b^{1}, b^{2}, b^{3}) are the coordinates of the vectors a and b in this basis, then their cross product can be written as a determinant:

$$\mathbf{a \times b} =
\begin{vmatrix}
\mathbf{e_1} & \mathbf{e_2} & \mathbf{e_3} \\
a^1 & a^2 & a^3 \\
b^1 & b^2 & b^3 \\
\end{vmatrix}
= \sum_{i=1}^3 \sum_{j=1}^3 \sum_{k=1}^3 \varepsilon_{ijk} \mathbf{e}_i a^j b^k$$

hence also using the Levi-Civita symbol, and more simply:

$$(\mathbf{a \times b})^i = \sum_{j=1}^3 \sum_{k=1}^3 \varepsilon_{ijk} a^j b^k.$$

In Einstein notation, the summation symbols may be omitted, and the ith component of their cross product equals

$$(\mathbf{a\times b})^i = \varepsilon_{ijk} a^j b^k.$$

The first component is

$$(\mathbf{a\times b})^1 = a^2 b^3-a^3 b^2\,,$$

then by cyclic permutations of 1, 2, 3 the others can be derived immediately, without explicitly calculating them from the above formulae:

$$\begin{align}
(\mathbf{a\times b})^2 &= a^3 b^1-a^1 b^3\,, \\
(\mathbf{a\times b})^3 &= a^1 b^2-a^2 b^1\,.
\end{align}$$

==== Triple scalar product (three vectors) ====
From the above expression for the cross product, we have:

$$\mathbf{a\times b} = -\mathbf{b\times a}$$.

If c = (c^{1}, c^{2}, c^{3}) is a third vector, then the triple scalar product equals

$$\mathbf{a}\cdot(\mathbf{b\times c}) = \varepsilon_{ijk} a^i b^j c^k.$$

From this expression, it can be seen that the triple scalar product is antisymmetric when exchanging any pair of arguments. For example,

$$\mathbf{a}\cdot(\mathbf{b\times c})= -\mathbf{b}\cdot(\mathbf{a\times c})$$.

==== Curl (one vector field) ====
If F = (F^{1}, F^{2}, F^{3}) is a vector field defined on some open set of $\mathbb{R}^3$ as a function of position x = (x^{1}, x^{2}, x^{3}) (using Cartesian coordinates). Then the ith component of the curl of F equals

$$(\nabla \times \mathbf{F})^i(\mathbf{x}) = \varepsilon_{ijk}\frac{\partial}{\partial x^j} F^k(\mathbf{x}),$$

which follows from the cross product expression above, substituting components of the gradient vector operator (nabla).

== Tensor density ==
In any arbitrary curvilinear coordinate system and even in the absence of a metric on the manifold, the Levi-Civita symbol as defined above may be considered to be a tensor density field in two different ways. It may be regarded as a contravariant tensor density of weight +1 or as a covariant tensor density of weight −1. In n dimensions using the generalized Kronecker delta,

$$\begin{align}
\varepsilon^{\mu_1 \dots \mu_n} &= \delta^{\mu_1 \dots \mu_n}_{\,1 \,\dots \,n} \, \\
\varepsilon_{\nu_1 \dots \nu_n} &= \delta^{\,1 \,\dots \,n}_{\nu_1 \dots \nu_n} \,.
\end{align}$$

Notice that these are numerically identical. In particular, the sign is the same.

== Levi-Civita tensors ==
On a pseudo-Riemannian manifold, one may define a coordinate-invariant covariant tensor field whose coordinate representation agrees with the Levi-Civita symbol wherever the coordinate system is such that the basis of the tangent space is orthonormal with respect to the metric and matches a selected orientation. This tensor should not be confused with the tensor density field mentioned above. The presentation in this section closely follows Carroll 2004.

The covariant Levi-Civita tensor (also known as the Riemannian volume form) in any coordinate system that matches the selected orientation is

$$E_{a_1\dots a_n} = \sqrt{\left|\det [g_{ab}]\right|}\, \varepsilon_{a_1\dots a_n} \,,$$

where g_{ab} is the representation of the metric in that coordinate system. We can similarly consider a contravariant Levi-Civita tensor by raising the indices with the metric as usual,

$$E^{a_1\dots a_n} = E_{b_1\dots b_n} \prod_{i=1}^n g^{a_i b_i} = \frac{1}{\sqrt{\left|\det [g_{ab}]\right|}} \, \varepsilon^{a_1 \dots a_n},,$$

but notice that if the metric signature contains an odd number of negative eigenvalues q, then the sign of the components of this tensor differ from the standard Levi-Civita symbol:

$$E^{a_1\dots a_n} = \frac{ \sgn \left( \det [g_{ab}] \right) }{ \sqrt{ \left| \det [g_{ab}] \right| }} \, \varepsilon^{a_1\dots a_n} ,$$

where sgn(det[g_{ab}]) = (−1)^{q}, $\varepsilon_{a_1\dots a_n}$ is the usual Levi-Civita symbol discussed in the rest of this article, and we used the definition of the metric determinant in the derivation. More explicitly, when the tensor and basis orientation are chosen such that $E_{01\dots n} = +\sqrt{\left|\det [g_{ab}]\right|}$, we have that $E^{01\dots n} = \frac{\sgn(\det [g_{ab}])}{\sqrt{\left|\det [g_{ab}]\right|}}$.

From this we can infer the identity,

$$E^{\mu_1\dots\mu_p\alpha_1\dots\alpha_{n-p}}E_{\mu_1\dots\mu_p\beta_1\dots\beta_{n-p}} = (-1)^q p!\delta^{\alpha_1\dots\alpha_{n-p}}_{\beta_1\dots\beta_{n-p}} \,,$$

where

$$\delta^{\alpha_1 \dots \alpha_{n-p}}_{\beta_1 \dots \beta_{n-p}} = (n-p)! \delta^{\lbrack \alpha_1}_{\beta_1} \dots \delta^{\alpha_{n-p} \rbrack}_{\beta_{n-p}}$$

is the generalized Kronecker delta.

=== Example: Minkowski space ===
In Minkowski space (the four-dimensional spacetime of special relativity), the covariant Levi-Civita tensor is

$$E_{\alpha \beta \gamma \delta} = \pm \sqrt{ \left| \det [g_{\mu \nu}] \right| } \, \varepsilon_{\alpha \beta \gamma \delta} \,,$$

where the sign depends on the orientation of the basis. The contravariant Levi-Civita tensor is

$$E^{\alpha \beta \gamma \delta} = g^{\alpha \zeta} g^{\beta \eta} g^{\gamma \theta} g^{\delta \iota} E_{\zeta \eta \theta \iota} \,.$$

The following are examples of the general identity above specialized to Minkowski space (with the negative sign arising from the odd number of negatives in the signature of the metric tensor in either sign convention):

$$\begin{align}
E_{\alpha \beta \gamma \delta} E_{\rho \sigma \mu \nu} & = -g_{\alpha \zeta} g_{\beta \eta} g_{\gamma \theta} g_{\delta \iota} \delta^{\zeta \eta \theta \iota}_{\rho \sigma \mu \nu} \\
E^{\alpha \beta \gamma \delta} E^{\rho \sigma \mu \nu} & = -g^{\alpha \zeta} g^{\beta \eta} g^{\gamma \theta} g^{\delta \iota} \delta^{\rho \sigma \mu \nu}_{\zeta \eta \theta \iota} \\
E^{\alpha \beta \gamma \delta} E_{\alpha \beta \gamma \delta} & = - 24 \\
E^{\alpha \beta \gamma \delta} E_{\rho \beta \gamma \delta} & = - 6 \delta^{\alpha}_{\rho} \\
E^{\alpha \beta \gamma \delta} E_{\rho \sigma \gamma \delta} & = - \delta^{\alpha \beta}_{\rho \sigma} \\
E^{\alpha \beta \gamma \delta} E_{\rho \sigma \theta \delta} & = - \delta^{\alpha \beta \gamma}_{\rho \sigma \theta} \,.
\end{align}$$

== See also ==
- Anticommutative property
- List of permutation topics
- Symmetric tensor
