= Tensor density =

Generalization of tensor fields

In differential geometry, a tensor density or relative tensor is a generalization of the tensor field concept. A tensor density transforms as a tensor field when passing from one coordinate system to another (see tensor field), except that it is additionally multiplied or weighted by a power $W$ of the Jacobian determinant of the coordinate transition function or its absolute value. A tensor density with a single index is called a vector density. A distinction is made among (authentic) tensor densities, pseudotensor densities, even tensor densities and odd tensor densities. Sometimes tensor densities with a negative weight $W$ are called tensor capacity. A tensor density can also be regarded as a section of the tensor product of a tensor bundle with a density bundle.

== Motivation ==
In physics and related fields, it is often useful to work with the components of an algebraic object rather than the object itself. An example would be decomposing a vector into a sum of basis vectors weighted by some coefficients such as
$$\vec{v} = c_1 \vec{e}_1 + c_2 \vec e_2 + c_ 3\vec e_3$$
where $\vec v$ is a vector in 3-dimensional Euclidean space, $c_i \in \R^1 \text{ and } \vec e_i$ are the usual standard basis vectors in Euclidean space. This is usually necessary for computational purposes, and can often be insightful when algebraic objects represent complex abstractions but their components have concrete interpretations. However, with this identification, one has to be careful to track changes of the underlying basis in which the quantity is expanded; it may in the course of a computation become expedient to change the basis while the vector $\vec v$ remains fixed in physical space. More generally, if an algebraic object represents a geometric object, but is expressed in terms of a particular basis, then it is necessary to, when the basis is changed, also change the representation. Physicists will often call this representation of a geometric object a tensor if it transforms under a sequence of linear maps given a linear change of basis (although confusingly others call the underlying geometric object which hasn't changed under the coordinate transformation a "tensor", a convention this article strictly avoids). In general there are representations which transform in arbitrary ways depending on how the geometric invariant is reconstructed from the representation. In certain special cases it is convenient to use representations which transform almost like tensors, but with an additional, nonlinear factor in the transformation. A prototypical example is a matrix representing the cross product (area of spanned parallelogram) on $\R^2.$ The representation is given by in the standard basis by
$$\vec u \times \vec v =
\begin{bmatrix} u_1& u_2 \end{bmatrix} \begin{bmatrix}0 & 1 \\ -1 & 0 \end{bmatrix} \begin{bmatrix}v_1 \\ v_2 \end{bmatrix} =
u_1 v_2 - u_2 v_1$$

If we now try to express this same expression in a basis other than the standard basis, then the components of the vectors will change, say according to
$$\begin{bmatrix} u'_1 & u'_2 \end{bmatrix}^\textsf{T} = A \begin{bmatrix} u_1 & u_2 \end{bmatrix}^\textsf{T}$$
where $A$ is some 2 by 2 matrix of real numbers. Given that the area of the spanned parallelogram is a geometric invariant, it cannot have changed under the change of basis, and so the new representation of this matrix must be:
$$\left(A^{-1}\right)^\textsf{T} \begin{bmatrix}0 & 1 \\ -1 & 0 \end{bmatrix} A^{-1}$$
which, when expanded is just the original expression but multiplied by the determinant of $A^{-1},$ which is also $\frac{1}{\det A}.$ In fact this representation could be thought of as a two index tensor transformation, but instead, it is computationally easier to think of the tensor transformation rule as multiplication by $\frac{1}{\det A},$ rather than as 2 matrix multiplications (In fact in higher dimensions, the natural extension of this is $n, n \times n$ matrix multiplications, which for large $n$ is completely infeasible). Objects which transform in this way are called tensor densities because they arise naturally when considering problems regarding areas and volumes, and so are frequently used in integration.

== Definition ==
Some authors classify tensor densities into the two types called (authentic) tensor densities and pseudotensor densities in this article. Other authors classify them differently, into the types called even tensor densities and odd tensor densities. When a tensor density weight is an integer there is an equivalence between these approaches that depends upon whether the integer is even or odd.

Note that these classifications elucidate the different ways that tensor densities may transform somewhat pathologically under orientation-reversing coordinate transformations. Regardless of their classifications into these types, there is only one way that tensor densities transform under orientation-preserving coordinate transformations.

In this article we have chosen the convention that assigns a weight of +2 to $g = \det\left(g_{\rho\sigma}\right)$, the determinant of the metric tensor expressed with covariant indices. With this choice, classical densities, like charge density, will be represented by tensor densities of weight +1. Some authors use a sign convention for weights that is the negation of that presented here.

In this article, we use Einstein notation: if a letter (usually Greek) representing a tensor index appears as both a covariant index and a contravariant index in a term then it is assumed that the term is summed over all possible values of that index.

In contrast to the meaning used in this article, in general relativity "pseudotensor" sometimes means an object that does not transform like a tensor or relative tensor of any weight.

=== Tensor and pseudotensor densities ===
For example, a mixed rank-two (authentic) tensor density of weight $W$ transforms as:

${\mathfrak{T}}^\alpha_\beta = \left( \det{\left[\frac{\partial \bar{x}^{\iota}}{\partial {x}^{\gamma}}\right]} \right)^{W} \, \frac{\partial {x}^{\alpha}}{\partial \bar{x}^{\delta}} \, \frac{\partial \bar{x}^{\epsilon}}{\partial {x}^{\beta}} \, \bar{\mathfrak{T}}^{\delta}_{\epsilon} \,,$ ((authentic) tensor density of (integer) weight $W$)

where $\bar{\mathfrak{T}}$ is the rank-two tensor density in the $\bar{x}$ coordinate system, ${\mathfrak{T}}$ is the transformed tensor density in the ${x}$ coordinate system; and we use the Jacobian determinant. Because the determinant can be negative, which it is for an orientation-reversing coordinate transformation, this formula is applicable only when $W$ is an integer. (However, see even and odd tensor densities below.)

We say that a tensor density is a pseudotensor density when there is an additional sign flip under an orientation-reversing coordinate transformation. A mixed rank-two pseudotensor density of weight $W$ transforms as

${\mathfrak{T}}^\alpha_\beta = \sgn\left( \det{\left[\frac{\partial \bar{x}^{\iota}}{\partial {x}^{\gamma}}\right]} \right) \left( \det{\left[\frac{\partial \bar{x}^{\iota}}{\partial {x}^{\gamma}}\right]} \right)^{W} \, \frac{\partial {x}^{\alpha}}{\partial \bar{x}^{\delta}} \, \frac{\partial \bar{x}^{\epsilon}}{\partial {x}^{\beta}} \, \bar{\mathfrak{T}}^{\delta}_{\epsilon} \,,$ (pseudotensor density of (integer) weight $W$)

where sgn($\cdot$) is a function that returns +1 when its argument is positive or −1 when its argument is negative.

=== Even and odd tensor densities ===
The transformations for even and odd tensor densities have the benefit of being well defined even when $W$ is not an integer. Thus one can speak of, say, an odd tensor density of weight +2 or an even tensor density of weight −1/2.

An even tensor density transforms as follows. Although the formula works for any real valued weight W, the name arises because the transformation is equivalent to the transformation of an (authentic) tensor density transform when its weight is even.

${\mathfrak{T}}^\alpha_\beta = \left\vert \det{\left[\frac{\partial \bar{x}^{\iota}}{\partial {x}^{\gamma}}\right]} \right\vert^{W} \, \frac{\partial {x}^{\alpha}}{\partial \bar{x}^{\delta}} \, \frac{\partial \bar{x}^{\epsilon}}{\partial {x}^{\beta}} \, \bar{\mathfrak{T}}^{\delta}_{\epsilon} \,.$ (even tensor density of weight $W$)

Similarly, an odd tensor density transforms as follows. Although the formula works for any real valued weight W, the name arises because the transformation is equivalent to the transformation of an (authentic) tensor density transform when its weight is odd.

${\mathfrak{T}}^\alpha_\beta = \sgn \left( \det{\left[\frac{\partial \bar{x}^{\iota}}{\partial {x}^{\gamma}}\right]} \right) \left\vert \det{\left[\frac{\partial \bar{x}^{\iota}}{\partial {x}^{\gamma}}\right]} \right\vert^{W} \, \frac{\partial {x}^{\alpha}}{\partial \bar{x}^{\delta}} \, \frac{\partial \bar{x}^{\epsilon}}{\partial {x}^{\beta}} \, \bar{\mathfrak{T}}^{\delta}_{\epsilon} \,.$ (odd tensor density of weight $W$)

=== Weights of zero and one ===
A tensor density of any type that has weight zero is also called an absolute tensor. An authentic tensor density of weight zero, which is also an even tensor density of weight zero, is also called an ordinary tensor.

If a weight is not specified but the word "relative" or "density" is used in a context where a specific weight is needed, it is usually assumed that the weight is +1.

=== Algebraic properties ===
1. A linear combination (also known as a weighted sum) of tensor densities of the same type and weight $W$ is again a tensor density of that type and weight.
2. A product of two tensor densities of any types, and with weights $W_1$ and $W_2$, is a tensor density of weight $W_1 + W_2.$ Furthermore, a product of authentic tensor densities and pseudotensor densities will be an authentic tensor density when an even number of the factors are pseudotensor densities; it will be a pseudotensor density when an odd number of the factors are pseudotensor densities. Similarly, a product of even tensor densities and odd tensor densities will be an even tensor density when an even number of the factors are odd tensor densities; it will be an odd tensor density when an odd number of the factors are odd tensor densities.
3. The contraction of indices on a tensor density with weight $W$ again yields a tensor density of weight $W.$
4. Raising and lowering indices using the metric tensor (which is authentic, even, and of weight 0) leaves the weight unchanged, as can be proved by combining (2) and (3).

=== Matrix inversion and matrix determinant of tensor densities ===
If ${\mathfrak{T}}_{\alpha\beta}$ is a non-singular matrix and a rank-two tensor density of weight $W$ with covariant indices then its matrix inverse will be a rank-two tensor density of weight $-W$ with contravariant indices. Similar statements apply when the two indices are contravariant or are mixed covariant and contravariant.

If ${\mathfrak{T}}_{\alpha\beta}$ is a rank-two tensor density of weight $W$ with covariant indices then the matrix determinant $\det {\mathfrak{T}}_{\alpha\beta}$ will have weight $N W + 2,$ where $N$ is the number of space-time dimensions. If ${\mathfrak{T}}^{\alpha\beta}$ is a rank-two tensor density of weight $W$ with contravariant indices then the matrix determinant $\det {\mathfrak{T}}^{\alpha\beta}$ will have weight $N W - 2.$ The matrix determinant $\det {\mathfrak{T}}^{\alpha}_{~\beta}$ will have weight $N W.$

== General relativity ==
=== Relation of Jacobian determinant and metric tensor ===
Any non-singular ordinary tensor $T_{\mu\nu}$ transforms as
$$T_{\mu\nu} = \frac{\partial \bar{x}^\kappa}{\partial {x}^\mu} \bar{T}_{\kappa\lambda} \frac{\partial \bar{x}^\lambda}{\partial {x}^\nu} \,,$$

where the right-hand side can be viewed as the product of three matrices. Taking the determinant of both sides of the equation (using that the determinant of a matrix product is the product of the determinants), dividing both sides by $\det\left(\bar{T}_{\kappa\lambda}\right),$ and taking their square root gives
$$\left\vert \det{\left[\frac{\partial \bar{x}^\iota}{\partial {x}^\gamma}\right]} \right\vert =
\sqrt{\frac{\det({T}_{\mu\nu})}{\det\left(\bar{T}_{\kappa\lambda}\right)}}\,.$$

When the tensor $T$ is the metric tensor, ${g}_{\kappa\lambda},$ and $\bar{x}^\iota$ is a locally inertial coordinate system where $\bar{g}_{\kappa\lambda} = \eta_{\kappa\lambda} =$ diag(−1,+1,+1,+1), the Minkowski metric, then $\det\left(\bar{g}_{\kappa\lambda}\right) = \det(\eta_{\kappa\lambda}) =$ −1 and so
$$\left\vert \det{\left[\frac{\partial \bar{x}^{\iota}}{\partial {x}^{\gamma}}\right]} \right\vert =
\sqrt{-{g}}\,,$$

where ${g} = \det\left({g}_{\mu\nu}\right)$ is the determinant of the metric tensor ${g}_{\mu\nu}.$

=== Use of metric tensor to manipulate tensor densities ===
Consequently, an even tensor density, $\mathfrak{T}^{\mu \dots}_{\nu \dots},$ of weight $W$, can be written in the form
$$\mathfrak{T}^{\mu \dots}_{\nu \dots} = \sqrt{-g}\;^W T^{\mu \dots}_{\nu \dots} \,,$$

where $T^{\mu \dots}_{\nu \dots} \,$ is an ordinary tensor. In a locally inertial coordinate system, where $g_{\kappa\lambda} = \eta_{\kappa\lambda},$ it will be the case that $\mathfrak{T}^{\mu \dots}_{\nu \dots}$ and $T^{\mu \dots}_{\nu \dots} \,$ will be represented with the same numbers.

When using the metric connection (Levi-Civita connection), the covariant derivative of an even tensor density is defined as
$$\mathfrak{T}^{\mu \dots}_{\nu \dots ; \alpha} =
\sqrt{-g}\;^W T^{\mu \dots}_{\nu \dots ; \alpha} =
\sqrt{-g}\;^W \left(\sqrt{-g}\;^{-W} \mathfrak{T}^{\mu \dots}_{\nu \dots}\right)_{;\alpha} \,.$$

For an arbitrary connection, the covariant derivative is defined by adding an extra term, namely
$$-W \, \Gamma^{\delta}_{~\delta \alpha} \, \mathfrak{T}^{\mu \dots}_{\nu \dots}$$
to the expression that would be appropriate for the covariant derivative of an ordinary tensor.

Equivalently, the product rule is obeyed
$$\left(\mathfrak{T}^{\mu \dots}_{\nu \dots} \mathfrak{S}^{\sigma \dots}_{\tau \dots}\right)_{; \alpha} =
\left(\mathfrak{T}^{\mu \dots}_{\nu \dots; \alpha}\right) \mathfrak{S}^{\sigma \dots}_{\tau \dots} +
\mathfrak{T}^{\mu \dots}_{\nu \dots} \left(\mathfrak{S}^{\sigma \dots}_{\tau \dots; \alpha}\right) \,,$$

where, for the metric connection, the covariant derivative of any function of $g_{\kappa\lambda}$ is always zero,
$$\begin{align}
g_{\kappa\lambda ; \alpha} & = 0 \\
\left(\sqrt{-g}\;^W\right)_{; \alpha} & = \left(\sqrt{-g}\;^W\right)_{, \alpha} - W \Gamma^{\delta}_{~\delta \alpha} \sqrt{-g}\;^W =
\frac W2 g^{\kappa\lambda} g_{\kappa\lambda,\alpha} \sqrt{-g}\;^W - W \Gamma^{\delta}_{~\delta \alpha} \sqrt{-g}\;^W = 0 \,.
\end{align}$$

== Examples ==
The expression $\sqrt{-g}$ is a scalar density. By the convention of this article it has a weight of +1.

The density of electric current $\mathfrak{J}^\mu$ (for example, $\mathfrak{J}^2$ is the amount of electric charge crossing the 3-volume element $d x^3 \, d x^4 \, d x^1$ divided by that element — do not use the metric in this calculation) is a contravariant vector density of weight +1. It is often written as $\mathfrak{J}^\mu = J^\mu \sqrt{-g}$ or $\mathfrak{J}^\mu = \varepsilon^{\mu\alpha\beta\gamma} \mathcal{J}_{\alpha\beta\gamma} / 3!,$ where $J^\mu\,$ and the differential form $\mathcal{J}_{\alpha\beta\gamma}$ are absolute tensors, and where $\varepsilon^{\mu\alpha\beta\gamma}$ is the Levi-Civita symbol; see below.

The density of Lorentz force $\mathfrak{f}_\mu$ (that is, the linear momentum transferred from the electromagnetic field to matter within a 4-volume element $d x^1 \, d x^2 \, d x^3 \, d x^4$ divided by that element — do not use the metric in this calculation) is a covariant vector density of weight +1.

In $N$-dimensional space-time, the Levi-Civita symbol may be regarded as either a rank-$N$ contravariant (odd) authentic tensor density of weight +1 ($\epsilon^{\alpha_1 \cdots \epsilon_{\alpha_N}}$) or a rank-$N$ covariant (odd) authentic tensor density of weight −1 ($\epsilon_{\alpha_1 \cdots \epsilon_{\alpha_N}}$):
$$\epsilon^{\alpha_1 \cdots \epsilon_{\alpha_N}} = \bar\epsilon^{\beta_1 \cdots \epsilon_{\beta_N}} \frac{\partial x^{\alpha_1}}{\partial \bar{x}^{\beta_1}} \cdots \frac{\partial x^{\alpha_N}}{\partial \bar{x}^{\beta_N}} \left(\det \left[ \frac{\partial \bar{x}^{\beta}}{\partial x^{\alpha}} \right] \right)^{+1}$$
$$\epsilon_{\alpha_1 \cdots \epsilon_{\alpha_N}} = \bar\epsilon_{\beta_1 \cdots \epsilon_{\beta_N}} \frac{\partial \bar{x}^{\beta_1}}{\partial x^{\alpha_1}} \cdots \frac{\partial \bar{x}^{\beta_N}}{\partial x^{\alpha_N}} \left(\det \left[ \frac{\partial \bar{x}^{\beta}}{\partial x^{\alpha}} \right] \right)^{-1}\,.$$
Notice that the Levi-Civita symbol (so regarded) does not obey the usual convention for raising or lowering of indices with the metric tensor. That is, it is true that
$$\varepsilon^{\alpha\beta\gamma\delta}\,g_{\alpha\kappa}\,g_{\beta\lambda}\,g_{\gamma\mu}g_{\delta\nu} \,=\, \varepsilon_{\kappa\lambda\mu\nu}\,g \,,$$
but in general relativity, where $g = \det\left(g_{\rho\sigma}\right)$ is always negative, this is never equal to $\varepsilon_{\kappa\lambda\mu\nu}.$

The determinant of the metric tensor,
$$g = \det\left(g_{\rho\sigma}\right) = \frac{1}{4!} \varepsilon^{\alpha\beta\gamma\delta} \varepsilon^{\kappa\lambda\mu\nu} g_{\alpha\kappa} g_{\beta\lambda} g_{\gamma\mu} g_{\delta\nu}\,,$$
is an (even) authentic scalar density of weight +2, being the contraction of the product of 2 (odd) authentic tensor densities of weight +1 and four (even) authentic tensor densities of weight 0.

== See also ==
- Action (physics) – Physical quantity of energy × time
- Conservation law – Scientific law regarding conservation of a physical property
- Noether's theorem – Statement relating differentiable symmetries to conserved quantities
- Pseudotensor – Type of physical quantity
- Relative scalar
- Variational principle – Scientific principles enabling the use of the calculus of variations
