= Density on a manifold =

Section of a certain line bundle

In mathematics, and specifically differential geometry, a density is a spatially varying quantity on a differentiable manifold that can be integrated in an intrinsic manner. Abstractly, a density is a section of a certain line bundle, called the density bundle. An element of the density bundle at x is a function that assigns a volume for the parallelotope spanned by the n given tangent vectors at x.

From the operational point of view, a density is a collection of functions on coordinate charts which become multiplied by the absolute value of the Jacobian determinant in the change of coordinates. Densities can be generalized into s-densities, whose coordinate representations become multiplied by the s-th power of the absolute value of the jacobian determinant. On an oriented manifold, 1-densities can be canonically identified with the n-forms on M. On non-orientable manifolds this identification cannot be made, since the density bundle is the tensor product of the orientation bundle of M and the n-th exterior product bundle of T^{∗}M (see pseudotensor).

== Motivation (densities in vector spaces) ==
In general, there does not exist a natural concept of a "volume" for a parallelotope generated by vectors v_{1}, ..., v_{n} in a n-dimensional vector space V. However, if one wishes to define a function μ : V × ... × V → R that assigns a volume for any such parallelotope, it should satisfy the following properties:

- If any of the vectors v_{k} is multiplied by λ ∈ R, the volume should be multiplied by |λ|.
- If any linear combination of the vectors v_{1}, ..., v_{j−1}, v_{j+1}, ..., v_{n} is added to the vector v_{j}, the volume should stay invariant.

These conditions are equivalent to the statement that μ is given by a translation-invariant measure on V, and they can be rephrased as

$$\mu(Av_1,\ldots,Av_n)=\left|\det A\right|\mu(v_1,\ldots,v_n), \quad A\in \operatorname{GL}(V).$$

Any such mapping μ : V × ... × V → R is called a density on the vector space V. Note that if (v_{1}, ..., v_{n}) is any basis for V, then fixing μ(v_{1}, ..., v_{n}) will fix μ entirely; it follows that the set Vol(V) of all densities on V forms a one-dimensional vector space. Any n-form ω on V defines a density |ω| on V by

$$|\omega|(v_1,\ldots,v_n) := |\omega(v_1,\ldots,v_n)|.$$

=== Orientations on a vector space ===
The set Or(V) of all functions o : V × ... × V → R that satisfy

$$o(Av_1,\ldots,Av_n)=\operatorname{sign}(\det A)o(v_1,\ldots,v_n), \quad A\in \operatorname{GL}(V)$$

if $v_1,\ldots,v_n$ are linearly independent and $o(v_1,\ldots,v_n) = 0$ otherwise

forms a one-dimensional vector space, and an orientation on V is one of the two elements o ∈ Or(V) such that |o(v_{1}, ..., v_{n})| = 1 for any linearly independent v_{1}, ..., v_{n}. Any non-zero n-form ω on V defines an orientation o ∈ Or(V) such that

$$o(v_1,\ldots,v_n)|\omega|(v_1,\ldots,v_n) = \omega(v_1,\ldots,v_n),$$

and vice versa, any o ∈ Or(V) and any density μ ∈ Vol(V) define an n-form ω on V by

$$\omega(v_1,\ldots,v_n)= o(v_1,\ldots,v_n)\mu(v_1,\ldots,v_n).$$

In terms of tensor product spaces,

$$\operatorname{Or}(V)\otimes \operatorname{Vol}(V) = \bigwedge^n V^*, \quad \operatorname{Vol}(V) = \operatorname{Or}(V)\otimes \bigwedge^n V^*.$$

=== s-densities on a vector space ===
The s-densities on V are functions μ : V × ... × V → R such that

$$\mu(Av_1,\ldots,Av_n)=\left|\det A\right|^s\mu(v_1,\ldots,v_n), \quad A\in \operatorname{GL}(V).$$

Just like densities, s-densities form a one-dimensional vector space Vol^{s}(V), and any n-form ω on V defines an s-density |ω|^{s} on V by

$$|\omega|^s(v_1,\ldots,v_n) := |\omega(v_1,\ldots,v_n)|^s.$$

The product of s_{1}- and s_{2}-densities μ_{1} and μ_{2} form an (s_{1}+s_{2})-density μ by

$$\mu(v_1,\ldots,v_n) := \mu_1(v_1,\ldots,v_n)\mu_2(v_1,\ldots,v_n).$$

In terms of tensor product spaces this fact can be stated as

$$\operatorname{Vol}^{s_1}(V)\otimes \operatorname{Vol}^{s_2}(V) = \operatorname{Vol}^{s_1+s_2}(V).$$

== Definition ==
Formally, the s-density bundle Vol^{s}(M) of a differentiable manifold M is obtained by an associated bundle construction, intertwining the one-dimensional group representation

$$\rho(A) = \left|\det A\right|^{-s},\quad A\in \operatorname{GL}(n)$$

of the general linear group with the frame bundle of M.

The resulting line bundle is known as the bundle of s-densities, and is denoted by

$$\left|\Lambda\right|^s_M = \left|\Lambda\right|^s(TM).$$

A 1-density is also referred to simply as a density.

More generally, the associated bundle construction also allows densities to be constructed from any vector bundle E on M.

In detail, if (U_{α},φ_{α}) is an atlas of coordinate charts on M, then there is associated a local trivialization of $\left|\Lambda\right|^s_M$

$$t_\alpha : \left|\Lambda\right|^s_M|_{U_\alpha} \to \phi_\alpha(U_\alpha)\times\mathbb{R}$$

subordinate to the open cover U_{α} such that the associated GL(1)-cocycle satisfies

$$t_{\alpha\beta} = \left|\det (d\phi_\alpha\circ d\phi_\beta^{-1})\right|^{-s}.$$

== Integration ==
Densities play a significant role in the theory of integration on manifolds. Indeed, the definition of a density is motivated by how a measure dx changes under a change of coordinates (Folland 1999, Section 11.4, pp. 361-362).

Given a 1-density ƒ supported in a coordinate chart U_{α}, the integral is defined by

$$\int_{U_\alpha} f = \int_{\phi_\alpha(U_\alpha)} t_\alpha\circ f\circ\phi_\alpha^{-1}d\mu$$

where the latter integral is with respect to the Lebesgue measure on R^{n}. The transformation law for 1-densities together with the Jacobian change of variables ensures compatibility on the overlaps of different coordinate charts, and so the integral of a general compactly supported 1-density can be defined by a partition of unity argument. Thus 1-densities are a generalization of the notion of a volume form that does not necessarily require the manifold to be oriented or even orientable. One can more generally develop a general theory of Radon measures as distributional sections of $|\Lambda|^1_M$ using the Riesz-Markov-Kakutani representation theorem.

The set of 1/p-densities such that $|\phi|_p = \left( \int|\phi|^p \right)^{1/p} < \infty$ is a normed linear space whose completion $L^p(M)$ is called the intrinsic L^{p} space of M.

== Conventions ==
In some areas, particularly conformal geometry, a different weighting convention is used: the bundle of s-densities is instead associated with the character

$$\rho(A) = \left|\det A\right|^{-s/n}.$$

With this convention, for instance, one integrates n-densities (rather than 1-densities). Also in these conventions, a conformal metric is identified with a tensor density of weight 2.

== Properties ==
- The dual vector bundle of $|\Lambda|^s_M$ is $|\Lambda|^{-s}_M$.
- Tensor densities are sections of the tensor product of a density bundle with a tensor bundle.
