= Relative scalar =

In mathematics, a relative scalar (of weight w) is a scalar-valued function whose transform under a coordinate transform,

$$\bar{x}^j = \bar{x}^j(x^i)$$

on an n-dimensional manifold obeys the following equation

$$\bar{f}(\bar{x}^j) = J^w f(x^i)$$

where

$$J =  \left| \dfrac{\partial(x_1,\ldots,x_n)}{\partial(\bar{x}^1,\ldots,\bar{x}^n)} \right| ,$$

that is, the determinant of the Jacobian of the transformation. A scalar density refers to the $w=1$ case.

Relative scalars are an important special case of the more general concept of a relative tensor.

== Ordinary scalar ==
An ordinary scalar or absolute scalar refers to the $w=0$ case.

If $x^i$ and $\bar{x}^j$ refer to the same point $P$ on the manifold, then we desire $\bar{f}(\bar{x}^j) = f(x^i)$. This equation can be interpreted two ways when $\bar{x}^j$ are viewed as the "new coordinates" and $x^i$ are viewed as the "original coordinates". The first is as $\bar{f}(\bar{x}^j) = f(x^i(\bar{x}^j))$, which "converts the function to the new coordinates". The second is as $f(x^i)=\bar{f}(\bar{x}^j(x^i))$, which "converts back to the original coordinates. Of course, "new" or "original" is a relative concept.

There are many physical quantities that are represented by ordinary scalars, such as temperature and pressure.

=== Weight 0 example ===
Suppose the temperature in a room is given in terms of the function $f(x,y,z) = 2 x + y + 5$ in Cartesian coordinates $(x,y,z)$ and the function in cylindrical coordinates $(r,t,h)$ is desired. The two coordinate systems are related by the following sets of equations:
$$\begin{align}
r &= \sqrt{x^2 + y^2} \\
t &= \arctan(y/x) \\
h &= z
\end{align}$$
and
$$\begin{align}
x &= r \cos(t) \\
y &= r \sin(t) \\
z &= h.
\end{align}$$

Using $\bar{f}(\bar{x}^j) = f(x^i(\bar{x}^j))$ allows one to derive $\bar{f}(r,t,h)= 2 r \cos(t)+ r \sin(t) + 5$ as the transformed function.

Consider the point $P$ whose Cartesian coordinates are $(x,y,z)=(2,3,4)$ and whose corresponding value in the cylindrical system is $(r,t,h)=(\sqrt{13},\arctan{(3/2)},4)$. A quick calculation shows that $f(2,3,4)=12$ and $\bar{f}(\sqrt{13},\arctan{(3/2)},4)=12$ also. This equality would have held for any chosen point $P$. Thus, $f(x,y,z)$ is the "temperature function in the Cartesian coordinate system" and $\bar{f}(r,t,h)$ is the "temperature function in the cylindrical coordinate system".

One way to view these functions is as representations of the "parent" function that takes a point of the manifold as an argument and gives the temperature.

The problem could have been reversed. One could have been given $\bar{f}$ and wished to have derived the Cartesian temperature function $f$. This just flips the notion of "new" vs the "original" coordinate system.

Suppose that one wishes to integrate these functions over "the room", which will be denoted by $D$. (Yes, integrating temperature is strange but that's partly what's to be shown.) Suppose the region $D$ is given in cylindrical coordinates as $r$ from $[0,2]$, $t$ from $[0,\pi/2]$ and $h$ from $[0,2]$ (that is, the "room" is a quarter slice of a cylinder of radius and height 2). The integral of $f$ over the region $D$ is
$$\int_0^2 \! \int_{0}^\sqrt{2^2-x^2} \! \int_0^2 \! f(x,y,z) \, dz \, dy \, dx = 16 + 10 \pi.$$
The value of the integral of $\bar{f}$ over the same region is
$$\int_0^2 \! \int_{0}^{\pi/2} \! \int_0^2 \! \bar{f}(r,t,h) \, dh \, dt \, dr = 12 + 10 \pi.$$
They are not equal. The integral of temperature is not independent of the coordinate system used. It is non-physical in that sense, hence "strange". Note that if the integral of $\bar{f}$ included a factor of the Jacobian (which is just $r$), we get
$$\int_0^2 \! \int_{0}^{\pi/2} \! \int_0^2 \! \bar{f}(r,t,h) r \, dh \, dt \, dr = 16 + 10 \pi,$$
which is equal to the original integral but it is not however the integral of temperature because temperature is a relative scalar of weight 0, not a relative scalar of weight 1.

=== Weight 1 example ===
If we had said $f(x,y,z) = 2 x + y + 5$ was representing mass density, however, then its transformed value should include the Jacobian factor that takes into account the geometric distortion of the coordinate system. The transformed function is now $\bar{f}(r,t,h)= (2 r \cos(t)+ r \sin(t) + 5) r$. This time $f(2,3,4)=12$ but $\bar{f}(\sqrt{13},\arctan{(3/2)},4)=12\sqrt{29}$. As before is integral (the total mass) in Cartesian coordinates is
$$\int_0^2 \! \int_{0}^\sqrt{2^2-x^2} \! \int_0^2 \! f(x,y,z) \, dz \, dy \, dx = 16 + 10 \pi.$$
The value of the integral of $\bar{f}$ over the same region is
$$\int_0^2 \! \int_{0}^{\pi/2} \! \int_0^2 \! \bar{f}(r,t,h) \, dh \, dt \, dr = 16 + 10 \pi.$$
They are equal. The integral of mass density gives total mass which is a coordinate-independent concept. Note that if the integral of $\bar{f}$ also included a factor of the Jacobian like before, we get
$$\int_0^2 \! \int_{0}^{\pi/2} \! \int_0^2 \! \bar{f}(r,t,h) r \, dh \, dt \, dr = 24 + 40 \pi / 3 ,$$
which is not equal to the previous case.

== Other cases ==
Weights other than 0 and 1 do not arise as often. It can be shown the determinant of a type (0,2) tensor is a relative scalar of weight 2.

== See also ==
- Jacobian matrix and determinant
