= Palatini =

Palatini may refer to:

- Attilio Palatini (1889–1949), Italian mathematician
- Michele Palatini (1855–1914), Italian politician
- Palatini identity
- Palatini variation
- Latin plural of Palatine
- Palatini (Roman military), elite regiments, literally "Palace troops"
