= Holst action =

Formulation of general relativity

In the field of theoretical physics, the Holst action is an equivalent formulation of the Palatini action for General Relativity (GR) in terms of vierbeins (4D space-time frame field) by adding a part of a topological term (Nieh-Yan) which does not alter the classical equations of motion as long as there is no torsion,

$$S = \frac{1}{2} \int e e^{\alpha}_{\ I} e^{\beta}_{\ J}
(F_{\alpha\beta}^{\ \ \ IJ} - \alpha \ast F_{\alpha\beta}^{\ \ \ IJ})
\equiv \frac{1}{2} \int e e^{\alpha}_{\ I} e^{\beta}_{\ J}
(F_{\alpha\beta}^{\ \ \ IJ} - \frac{\alpha}{2} \epsilon^{IJ}_{\;\;\;KL}
F_{\alpha\beta}^{\ \ \ KL})$$

where $e^{\alpha}_{\ I}$ is the tetrad, $e$ its determinant (the space-time metric is recovered from the tetrad by the formula $g_{\alpha \beta }=e_{\alpha }^{I}e_{\beta }^{J}\eta _{IJ}$ where $\eta_{IJ}$ the Minkowski metric), $F_{\alpha\beta}^{\ \ \ IJ}$ the curvature considered as a function of the connection $A_{\alpha\beta}^{\ \ \ IJ}$:

$$F_{\alpha\beta}^{\ \ \ IJ} = {A_{\alpha \beta}}^{IJ} = 2 \partial_{[\alpha} {A_{\beta]}}^{IJ} + 2{A_{[\alpha}}^{IK} {A_{\beta] K}}^J$$,

$\alpha$ a (complex) parameter, and where we recover the Palatini action when $\alpha = 0$. It only works in 4D. To be torsion free means the covariant derivative defined by the connection $A_{\alpha\beta}^{\ \ \ IJ}$ when acting on the Minkowski metric $\eta_{IJ}$ vanishes, implying the connection is anti-symmetric in its internal indices $I,J$.

As with the first order tetradic Palatini action where $e^{\alpha}_{\ I}$ and $A_{\alpha\beta}^{\ \ \ IJ}$ are taken to be independent variables, variation of the action with respect to the connection $A_{\alpha\beta}^{\ \ \ IJ}$ (assuming it to be torsion-free) implies the curvature $F_{\alpha\beta}^{\ \ \ IJ}$ be replaced by the usual (mixed index) curvature tensor $R_{\alpha\beta}^{\ \ \ IJ}$ (see article tetradic Palatini action for definitions). Variation of the first term of the action with respect to the tetrad $e^{\alpha}_{\ I}$ gives the (mixed index) Einstein tensor and variation of the second term with respect to the tetrad gives a quantity that vanishes by symmetries of the Riemann tensor (specifically the first Bianchi identity), together these imply Einstein's vacuum field equations hold.

== Applications ==
The canonical 3+1 Hamiltonian formulation of the Holst action with $\alpha = i$ happens to correspond to Ashtekar variables which formulates (complex) GR as a special type of Yang-Mills gauge theory. The action was seen simply to be the Palatini action with the curvature tensor replaced by its self-dual part only (see article self-dual Palatini action).

The canonical 3+1 Hamiltonian formulation of the Holst action for real $\alpha$ was shown to have a configuration variable which is still a connection, and the theory still a special kind of Yang-Mills gauge theory, but has the advantage that it is real, as is then the corresponding gauge theory (so we are dealing with real General Relativity). This Hamiltonian formulation is the classical starting point of loop quantum gravity (LQG) which imports non-perturbative techniques from lattice gauge theory. The parameter defined by $\beta := 1 / \alpha$ is usually referred to as the Barbero-Immirzi parameter The Holst action finds application in most recent versions of spin foam models, which can be considered path integral versions of LQG.
