= Poincaré gauge theory =

Classical field theory describing gravitation

In theoretical physics, Poincaré gauge theory (PGT) is a classical field theory that describes gravitational interactions as a gauge theory based on enforcing the local Poincaré group—the group consisting of translations and Lorentz rotations. In PGT, the symmetries underlying special relativity are “gauged” to become local, introducing two sets of gauge fields: the tetrad field associated with translations and the spin connection for Lorentz transformations. These gauge fields naturally lead to a spacetime geometry known as Riemann–Cartan manifold, which generalizes Riemannian geometry by incorporating both curvature and torsion.

== Introduction and background ==
=== History of PGT ===
After the formulation of Yang–Mills theory, there were efforts to write gravity into a gauge field theory like the other forces in the Standard Model of particle physics. Ryoyu Utiyama established the basis of a gauge theory of gravity by recognizing that general relativity (GR) exhibits invariance under local Poincaré transformations. Dennis Sciama and Tom Kibble then further developed the application of gauge field theory to gravity. They constructed the Einstein–Cartan–Kibble–Sciama (ECKS) theory. However, in the ECKS theory, torsion is algebraic and vanishes in the vacuum. To include a dynamical torsion, Poincaré gauge theory is developed and studied by many authors.

=== The gauge principle ===
The core idea of a gauge theory is that a theory's equations should remain invariant under local transformations. In quantum electrodynamics (QED), requiring invariance under a local phase transformation, $\psi(x)\xrightarrow{} e^{i\alpha(x)}\psi(x)$ introduces a gauge field (the electromagnetic field) and a covariant derivative. This principle was generalized by Yang Chen-Ning and Robert Mills to non-Abelian symmetry groups like SU(N). For a theory to be invariant under local non-Abelian transformations, a set of gauge fields must be introduced. The interactions of these fields are described by a field strength tensor derived from the commutator of the covariant derivative. Unlike in the abelian case, the Lagrangian for a non-Abelian gauge field contains terms describing the self-interaction of the gauge fields. PGT applies this same principle to the Poincaré group.

== Building Poincaré gauge theory ==
=== Gauge fields and field strength tensors ===
The Poincaré group is the group of spacetime symmetries in special relativity, containing ten generators: four for translations and six for Lorentz transformations. The enforcement of local Poincaré symmetry with the gauge principle introduces two gauge fields:

- The tetrad field $b^a{}_\mu(x)$(and its inverse $h_a{}^\mu(x)$), corresponding to the translation group.
- The spin connection $A^{ab}{}_\mu(x)$, corresponding to the Lorentz group.

These fields are used to define a covariant derivative $D_a$ that ensures the theory remains invariant under local Poincaré transformations. The covariant derivative in this case is

$D_a \psi = h^\mu{}_a (\partial_\mu+\frac{1}{2}A^{cd}{}_\mu \Sigma_{cd})\psi,$

where $\Sigma_{cd}$ are the Lorentz group generators of the spin-specific representation of the matter field. Again, the field strength tensor are found from the commutation of the covariant derivative.

$[D_a,D_b]\psi = \left( \frac{1}{2}\mathcal{R}^{ab}{}_{cd}\Sigma_{ab} - \mathcal{T}^a{}_{bc} D_a \right) \psi ,$

They can be geometrically identified as

- torsion tensor $\mathcal{T}^a{}_{bc}=-2b^a{}_\mu D_{[b}h_{c]}{}^\mu$
- curvature tensor $\mathcal{R}^{ab}{}_{cd}= 2 h_c{}^\mu h_d{}^\nu\left(\partial_{[\mu}A^{ab}{}_{\nu]} + A^a{}_{e[\mu}A^{ae}{}_{\nu]}\right)$

Since there are both contributions from curvature and torsion, PGT has the geometrical structure of the Riemann–Cartan space, $U_4$, which is the most general spacetime with metric-compatible linear connection.

=== Construction of the quadratic PGT Lagrangian ===
The difference between PGT and the non-Abelian case is that: In Yang–Mills's theory, the field strength tensor $F^a{}_{\mu\nu}$ is a term that has both group indices and coordinate indices; whereas in PGT, the field strength tensors $\mathcal{R}^{ab}{}_{cd}$ and $\mathcal{T}^a{}_{bc}$ only have indices in the local Lorentz coordinate. Hence, it is possible to contract the upper and lower indices, implying the existence of a linear invariant

$\mathcal{R} = \mathcal{R}^{ab}{}_{ab}.$

This is equivalent to the Ricci scalar and is the only linear invariant that can be constructed. Similar to the cases of Yang–Mills's theory, the most general Lagrangian in this theory includes scalar terms constructed out of the contractions of the strength tensors, $\mathcal{R}^{ab}{}_{cd}$ and $\mathcal{T}^a{}_{bc}$. Since PGT is constructed analogously to Yang–Mills's theory, it is tempting to investigate the quadratic invariant terms of these tensors, analogous to the $-1/4F^{a,\mu\nu}F^a{}_{\mu\nu}$ term in Yang–Mills Lagrangian. The pseudo-scalar terms can be eliminated by imposing parity invariance, but can be included in the free-gravitational Lagrangian. The resulting Lagrangian for quadratic order PGT without pseudo-scalar term is

$\mathcal{L}_{\mathrm{PGT}} = h^{-1}\left[L_{\mathcal{R}^2}+\kappa^{-1}\left(L_{\mathcal{R}}+L_{\mathcal{T}^2}+ L_{\Lambda}\right)+L_m(\Phi,\Psi; h, A)\right],$

where $h^{-1} = 1/\text{det}(h_a{}^\mu)$,and $\kappa = 1/\mathrm{M}^2_{\mathrm{p}}$ is the Einstein's gravitational constant. Note that this Lagrangian is written in natural units. The Lagrangian densities are

$\begin{array}{rl} L_{\mathcal{R}} & = -\tfrac{1}{2}\alpha_0\mathcal{R}, \\[1ex] L_\Lambda & = -\Lambda, \\[1ex] L_{\mathcal{R}^2} & = \alpha_1\mathcal{R}^2+\alpha_2\mathcal{R}_{ab}\mathcal{R}^{ab}+\alpha_3 \mathcal{R}_{ab}\mathcal{R}^{ba} \\ & \quad +\alpha_4 \mathcal{R}_{abcd}\mathcal{R}^{abcd}+\alpha_5 \mathcal{R}_{abcd}\mathcal{R}^{acbd}+\alpha_6 \mathcal{R}_{abcd}\mathcal{R}^{cdab}, \\[1ex] L_{\mathcal{T}^2} & = \beta_1\mathcal{T}_{abc}\mathcal{T}^{abc}+\beta_2 \mathcal{T}_{abc}\mathcal{T}^{bac}+\beta_3 \mathcal{T}_a\mathcal{T}^a. \end{array}$

$L_m$ denotes the Lagrangian density resulting from the interaction between various matter fields coupled to the gauge fields. One cannot formally fit the whole Standard Model into the matter Lagrangian. Both bosonic fields $\Phi$ and fermionic fields $\Psi$ from the Standard Model are permitted in the matter Lagrangian as representations of SL(2, C). In the above equations, $\Lambda \sim eV^2$ is the cosmological constant. As in the case for general relativity, the cosmological constant can be absorbed into the matter Lagrangian, treating dark energy as part of the energy content of the Universe.

If the Lagrangian density contains only the term $L_\mathcal{R}$ and the matter Lagrangian, then it has the form of an Einstein–Hilbert Lagrangian, and therefore is a minimal generalization of Einstein's gravity to include torsion sourced by the spin-angular momentum of the matter field. This minimal generalization of GR is known as ECKS theory. In the absence of fermionic matter, ECKS theory is dynamically equivalent to GR. Otherwise, it involves torsion due to matter spin sources.
