= Self-dual Palatini action =

Formulation of general relativity

Ashtekar variables, which were a new canonical formalism of general relativity, raised new hopes for the canonical quantization of general relativity and eventually led to loop quantum gravity. Smolin and others independently discovered that there exists in fact a Lagrangian formulation of the theory by considering the self-dual formulation of the Tetradic Palatini action principle of general relativity. These proofs were given in terms of spinors. A purely tensorial proof of the new variables in terms of triads was given by Goldberg and in terms of tetrads by Henneaux et al.

== The Palatini action ==
The Palatini action for general relativity has as its independent variables the tetrad $e_I^\alpha$ and a spin connection ${\omega_\alpha}^{IJ}$. Many more details and derivations can be found in the article tetradic Palatini action. The spin connection defines a covariant derivative $D_\alpha$. The space-time metric is recovered from the tetrad by the formula $g_{\alpha \beta} = e^I_\alpha e^J_\beta \eta_{IJ}.$ We define the curvature as

$${\Omega_{\alpha \beta}}^{IJ} = \partial_\alpha {\omega_\beta}^{IJ} - \partial_\beta {\omega_\alpha}^{IJ} + \omega_\alpha^{IK} {\omega_{\beta K}}^{J} - \omega_\beta^{IK} {\omega_{\alpha K}}^{J}.$$

The Ricci scalar of this curvature is given by $e_I^\alpha e_J^\beta {\Omega_{\alpha \beta}}^{IJ}$. The Palatini action for general relativity reads

$$S = \int d^4 x \; e  \;e_I^\alpha e_J^\beta  \; {\Omega_{\alpha \beta}}^{IJ} [\omega],$$

where $e = \sqrt{-g}$. Variation with respect to the spin connection ${\omega_\alpha}^{IJ}$ implies that the spin connection is determined by the compatibility condition $D_\alpha e_I^\beta = 0$ and hence becomes the usual covariant derivative $\nabla_\alpha$. Hence the connection becomes a function of the tetrads and the curvature ${\Omega_{\alpha \beta}}^{IJ}$ is replaced by the curvature ${R_{\alpha \beta}}^{IJ}$ of $\nabla_\alpha$. Then, $e_I^\alpha e_J^\beta {R_{\alpha \beta}}^{IJ}$ is the actual Ricci scalar $R$. Variation with respect to the tetrad gives Einstein's equation

$$R_{\alpha \beta} - {1 \over 2} g_{\alpha \beta} R = 0.$$

== Self-dual variables ==
=== (Anti-)self-dual parts of a tensor ===
We will need what is called the totally antisymmetry tensor or Levi-Civita symbol, $\varepsilon_{IJKL}$, which is equal to either +1 or −1 depending on whether $IJKL$ is either an even or odd permutation of $0123$, respectively, and zero if any two indices take the same value. The internal indices of $\varepsilon_{IJKL}$ are raised with the Minkowski metric $\eta^{IJ}$.

Now, given any anti-symmetric tensor $T^{IJ}$, we define its dual as

$$*T^{IJ} = {1 \over 2} {\varepsilon_{KL}}^{IJ} T^{KL}.$$

The self-dual part of any tensor $T^{IJ}$ is defined as

$${}^+T^{IJ} := {1 \over 2} \left ( T^{IJ} - {i \over 2} {\varepsilon_{KL}}^{IJ} T^{KL} \right)$$

with the anti-self-dual part defined as

$${}^-T^{IJ} := {1 \over 2} \left ( T^{IJ} + {i \over 2} {\varepsilon_{KL}}^{IJ} T^{KL} \right)$$

(the appearance of the imaginary unit $i$ is related to the Minkowski signature as we will see below).

=== Tensor decomposition ===
Now given any anti-symmetric tensor $T^{IJ}$, we can decompose it as

$$T^{IJ} = \frac{1}{2} \left (T^{IJ} -\frac{i}{2} {\varepsilon_{KL}}^{IJ} T^{KL} \right ) + \frac{1}{2} \left (T^{IJ} +\frac{i}{2} {\varepsilon_{KL}}^{IJ} T^{KL} \right) ={}^+T^{IJ} +{}^-T^{IJ}$$

where ${}^+T^{IJ}$ and ${}^-T^{IJ}$ are the self-dual and anti-self-dual parts of $T^{IJ}$ respectively. Define the projector onto (anti-)self-dual part of any tensor as

$$P^{(\pm)} = {1 \over 2} (1 \mp i *).$$

The meaning of these projectors can be made explicit. Let us concentrate of $P^+$,

$$\left (P^+ T \right )^{IJ} = \left ({1 \over 2} (1-i*) T \right )^{IJ} = {1 \over 2} \left ( {\delta^I}_{K} {\delta^J}_{L} - i {1 \over 2} {\varepsilon_{KL}}^{IJ} \right) T^{KL} = {1 \over 2} \left (T^{IJ} - {i \over 2} {\varepsilon_{KL}}^{IJ} T^{KL} \right ) = {}^+ T^{IJ}.$$

Then

$${}^\pm T^{IJ} = \left (P^{(\pm)} T \right)^{IJ}.$$

=== The Lie bracket ===
An important object is the Lie bracket defined by

$$[F, G]^{IJ} := F^{IK} {G_K}^{J} - G^{IK} {F_K}^{J},$$

it appears in the curvature tensor (see the last two terms of Eq. 1), it also defines the algebraic structure. We have the results (proved below):

$$P^{(\pm)} [F, G]^{IJ} = \left [P^{(\pm)} F, G \right ]^{IJ} = \left [F, P^{(\pm)} G \right ]^{IJ} = \left [P^{(\pm)} F, P^{(\pm)} G \right ]^{IJ} \qquad Eq. 2$$

and

$$[F, G] = \left [P^+ F, P^+ G \right ] + \left [P^- F, P^- G \right ].$$

That is the Lie bracket, which defines an algebra, decomposes into two separate independent parts. We write

$$\mathfrak{so}(1,3)_\Complex = \mathfrak{so}(1,3)_\Complex^+ + \mathfrak{so}(1,3)_\Complex^-$$

where $\mathfrak{so}(1,3)_\Complex^\pm$ contains only the self-dual (anti-self-dual) elements of $\mathfrak{so}(1,3)_\Complex.$

== The Self-dual Palatini action ==
We define the self-dual part, ${A_\alpha}^{IJ}$, of the connection ${\omega_\alpha}^{IJ}$ as

$${A_\alpha}^{IJ} = {1 \over 2} \left ( {\omega_\alpha}^{IJ} - {i \over 2} {\varepsilon_{KL}}^{IJ} {\omega_\alpha}^{KL} \right),$$

which can be more compactly written

$${A_\alpha}^{IJ} = \left (P^+ \omega_\alpha \right )^{IJ}.$$

Define ${F_{\alpha \beta}}^{IJ}$ as the curvature of the self-dual connection

$${F_{\alpha \beta}}^{IJ} = \partial_\alpha {A_\beta}^{IJ} - \partial_\beta {A_\alpha}^{IJ} + {A_\alpha}^{IK} {A_{\beta K}}^{J} - {A_\beta}^{IK} {A_{\alpha K}}^{J}.$$

Using Eq. 2 it is easy to see that the curvature of the self-dual connection is the self-dual part of the curvature of the connection,

$$\begin{align}
{F_{\alpha \beta}}^{IJ} &= \partial_\alpha \left (P^+ \omega_\beta \right )^{IJ} - \partial_\beta \left (P^+ \omega_\alpha \right )^{IJ} + \left [P^+ \omega_\alpha, P^+ \omega_\beta \right ]^{IJ} \\
&= \left (P^+ 2 \partial_{[\alpha} \omega_{\beta]} \right )^{IJ} + \left (P^+ [\omega_\alpha, \omega_\beta] \right )^{IJ} \\
&= \left (P^+ \Omega_{\alpha \beta} \right )^{IJ}
\end{align}$$

The self-dual action is

$$S = \int d^4 x \; e  \;e_I^\alpha e_J^\beta  \; {F_{\alpha \beta}}^{IJ}.$$

As the connection is complex we are dealing with complex general relativity and appropriate conditions must be specified to recover the real theory. One can repeat the same calculations done for the Palatini action but now with respect to the self-dual connection ${A_\alpha}^{IJ}$. Varying the tetrad field, one obtains a self-dual analog of Einstein's equation:

$${}^+R_{\alpha \beta} - {1 \over 2} g_{\alpha \beta} {}^+R = 0.$$

That the curvature of the self-dual connection is the self-dual part of the curvature of the connection helps to simplify the 3+1 formalism (details of the decomposition into the 3+1 formalism are to be given below). The resulting Hamiltonian formalism resembles that of a Yang-Mills gauge theory (this does not happen with the 3+1 Palatini formalism which basically collapses down to the usual ADM formalism).

== Derivation of main results for self-dual variables ==
The results of calculations done here can be found in chapter 3 of notes Ashtekar Variables in Classical Relativity. The method of proof follows that given in section II of The Ashtekar Hamiltonian for General Relativity. We need to establish some results for (anti-)self-dual Lorentzian tensors.

=== Identities for the totally anti-symmetric tensor ===
Since $\eta_{IJ}$ has signature $(-,+,+,+)$, it follows that

$$\varepsilon^{IJKL} = - \varepsilon_{IJKL} .$$

to see this consider,

$$\varepsilon^{0123} = \eta^{0I} \eta^{1J} \eta^{2K} \eta^{3L} \varepsilon_{IJKL} = (-1) (1) (1) (1) \varepsilon_{0123} = - \varepsilon_{0123}.$$

With this definition one can obtain the following identities,

$$\begin{align}
\varepsilon^{IJKO}\varepsilon_{LMNO} &= -6 \delta^I_{[L} \delta^J_M \delta^K_{N]} && \text{Eq. 3} \\
\varepsilon^{IJMN}\varepsilon_{KLMN} &= -4 \delta^I_{[K} \delta^J_{L]} = - 2 \left (\delta^I_K \delta^J_L - \delta^I_L \delta^J_K \right ) && \text{Eq. 4}
\end{align}$$

(the square brackets denote anti-symmetrizing over the indices).

=== Definition of self-dual tensor ===
It follows from Eq. 4 that the square of the duality operator is minus the identity,

$$** T^{IJ} = {1 \over 4} {\varepsilon_{KL}}^{IJ} {\varepsilon_{MN}}^{KL} T^{MN} = - T^{IJ}$$

The minus sign here is due to the minus sign in Eq. 4, which is in turn due to the Minkowski signature. Had we used Euclidean signature, i.e. $(+,+,+,+)$, instead there would have been a positive sign. We define $S^{IJ}$ to be self-dual if and only if

$$*S^{IJ} = i S^{IJ} .$$

(with Euclidean signature the self-duality condition would have been $*S^{IJ} = S^{IJ}$). Say $S^{IJ}$ is self-dual, write it as a real and imaginary part,

$$S^{IJ} = {1 \over 2} T^{IJ} + \frac{i}{2} U^{IJ}.$$

Write the self-dual condition in terms of $U$ and $V$,

$$* \left (T^{IJ} + i U^{IJ} \right ) = {1 \over 2} {\varepsilon_{KL}}^{IJ} \left (T^{KL} + i U^{KL} \right ) = i \left (T^{IJ} + i U^{IJ} \right ) .$$

Equating real parts we read off

$$U^{IJ} = - {1 \over 2} {\varepsilon_{KL}}^{IJ} T^{KL}$$

and so

$$S^{IJ} = {1 \over 2} \left (T^{IJ} - {i \over 2} {\varepsilon_{KL}}^{IJ} T^{KL} \right )$$

where $T^{IJ}$ is the real part of $2 S^{IJ}$.

=== Important lengthy calculation ===
The proof of Eq. 2 in straightforward. We start by deriving an initial result. All the other important formula easily follow from it. From the definition of the Lie bracket and with the use of the basic identity Eq. 3 we have

$$\begin{align}
*[F,*G]^{IJ} &= \frac{1}{2} {\varepsilon_{MN}}^{IJ} \left (F^{MK} {(*G)_K}^{N} -(*G)^{MK} {F_K}^{N} \right ) \\
&= \frac{1}{2} {\varepsilon_{MN}}^{IJ} \left (F^{MK} \frac{1}{2} {\varepsilon_{OPK}}^{N} G^{OP} - \frac{1}{2} {\varepsilon_{OP}}^{MK} G^{OP} {F_K}^{N} \right ) \\
&= {1 \over 4} \left ( {\varepsilon_{MN}}^{IJ} {\varepsilon_{OP}}^{KN} + {\varepsilon_{NM}}^{IJ} {\varepsilon_{OP}}^{NK} \right ) {F^M}_{K} G^{OP} \\
&= {1 \over 2} {\varepsilon_{MN}}^{IJ} {\varepsilon_{OP}}^{KN} {F^M}_{K} G^{OP} \\
&= {1 \over 2} \varepsilon^{MIJN} \varepsilon_{OPKN} {F_M}^{K} G^{OP} \\
&= -\frac{1}{2} \varepsilon^{KIJN} \varepsilon_{OPMN} {F^M}_{K} G^{OP} \\
&= \frac{1}{2} \left (\delta^K_O \delta^I_P \delta^J_M + \delta^K_M \delta^I_O \delta^J_P + \delta^K_P \delta^I_M \delta^J_O - \delta^K_P \delta^I_O \delta^J_M - \delta^K_M \delta^I_P \delta^J_O - \delta^K_O \delta^I_M \delta^J_P \right ) {F^M}_{K} G^{OP} \\
&= \frac{1}{2} \left ({F^J}_{K} G^{KI} + {F^K}_{K} G^{IJ} + {F^I}_{K} G^{JK} - {F^J}_{K} G^{IK} - {F^K}_{K} G^{JI} - {F^I}_{K} G^{KJ} \right ) \\
&= - F^{IK} {G_K}^{J} + G^{IK} {F_K}^{J} \\
&= -[F, G]^{IJ}
\end{align}$$

That gives the formula

$$*[F,*G]^{IJ} = - [F, G]^{IJ}  \qquad Eq.5.$$

=== Derivation of important results ===
Now using Eq.5 in conjunction with $** = - 1$ we obtain

$$* (- [F, G]^{IJ}) = *(*[F,*G]^{IJ}) = **[F,*G]^{IJ} = -[F,*G]^{IJ}.$$

So we have

$$* [F, G]^{IJ} = [F, *G]^{IJ}  \qquad Eq.6.$$

Consider

$$*[F,G]^{IJ} = - *[G,F]^{IJ} = - [G,*F]^{IJ} = [*F, G]^{IJ} .$$

where in the first step we have used the anti-symmetry of the Lie bracket to swap $F$ and $G$, in the second step we used $Eq.6$ and in the last step we used the anti-symmetry of the Lie bracket again. So we have

$$* [F, G]^{IJ} = [*F, G]^{IJ}  \qquad Eq.7.$$

Then

$$\begin{align}
\left (P^{(\pm)} [F, G] \right )^{IJ} &= {1 \over 2} \left ([F, G]^{IJ} \mp i * [F,G]^{IJ} \right ) \\
&= {1 \over 2} \left ([F, G]^{IJ} + [F, \mp i * G]^{IJ} \right ) \\
&= \left [F, P^{(\pm)} G \right ]^{IJ} && \text{Eq. 8}
\end{align}$$

where we used Eq. 6 going from the first line to the second line. Similarly we have

$$\left (P^{(\pm)} [F, G] \right )^{IJ} = [P^{(\pm)} F, G]^{IJ}  \qquad Eq.9$$

by using Eq 7. Now as $P^{(\pm)}$ is a projection it satisfies $(P^{(\pm)})^2 = P^{(\pm)}$, as can easily be verified by direct computation:

$$\begin{align}
{}(P^{(\pm)})^2 &= {1 \over 4} (1 \mp i *) (1 \mp i *) \\
{}&= {1 \over 4} (1 - ** \mp 2 i *) \\
{}&= {1 \over 4} (2 \mp 2 i *) \\
{}&= P^{(\pm)}
\end{align}$$

Applying this in conjunction with Eq. 8 and Eq. 9 we obtain

$$\begin{align}
{}\left( P^{(\pm)} [F,G] \right)^{IJ} &= \left( (P^{(\pm)})^2 [F,G] \right)^{IJ} \\
&= \left( P^{(\pm)} [F, P^{(\pm)} G] \right)^{IJ} \\
{}&= [P^{(\pm)} F , P^{(\pm)} G]^{IJ}  \qquad Eq.10.
\end{align}$$

From Eq. 10 and Eq. 9 we have

$$\left [P^{(\pm)} F, P^{(\pm)} G \right ]^{IJ} = \left [P^{(\pm)} F, G \right ]^{IJ} = \left [P^{(\pm)} F, P^{(\pm)} G + P^{(\mp)} G \right ]^{IJ} = \left [P^{(\pm)} F, P^{(\pm)} G \right ]^{IJ} + \left [P^{(\pm)} F, P^{(\mp)} G \right ]^{IJ}$$

where we have used that any $G$ can be written as a sum of its self-dual and anti-sef-dual parts, i.e. $G = P^{(\pm)} G + P^{(\mp)} G$. This implies:

$$\begin{align}
{}\left [P^+ F, P^- G \right ]^{IJ} &= 0 \\
{}\left [P^- F, P^+ G \right ]^{IJ} &= 0
\end{align}$$

=== Summary of main results ===
Altogether we have,

$$\left (P^{(\pm)} [F, G] \right )^{IJ} = \left [P^{(\pm)} F, G \right ]^{IJ} = \left [F, P^{(\pm)} G \right ]^{IJ} = \left [P^{(\pm)} F, P^{(\pm)} G \right ]^{IJ}$$

which is our main result, already stated above as Eq. 2. We also have that any bracket splits as

$$[F, G]^{IJ} = \left [P^+ F + P^- F, P^+ G + P^- F \right ]^{IJ}= \left [P^+ F, P^+ G \right ]^{IJ} + \left [P^- F, P^- G \right ]^{IJ}.$$

into a part that depends only on self-dual Lorentzian tensors and is itself the self-dual part of $[F, G]^{IJ},$ and a part that depends only on anti-self-dual Lorentzian tensors and is the anit-self-dual part of $[F, G]^{IJ}.$

== Derivation of Ashtekar's Formalism from the Self-dual Action ==
The proof given here follows that given in lectures by Jorge Pullin

The Palatini action

$$S(e,\omega) = \int d^4 x e e^a_I e^b_J {\Omega_{ab}}^{IJ} [\omega] \qquad Eq. 11$$

where the Ricci tensor, ${\Omega_{ab}}^{IJ}$, is thought of as constructed purely from the connection $\omega_a^{IJ}$, not using the frame field. Variation with respect to the tetrad gives Einstein's equations written in terms of the tetrads, but for a Ricci tensor constructed from the connection that has no a priori relationship with the tetrad. Variation with respect to the connection tells us the connection satisfies the usual compatibility condition

$$D_b e_a^I = 0.$$

This determines the connection in terms of the tetrad and we recover the usual Ricci tensor.

The self-dual action for general relativity is given above.

$$S(e,A) = \int d^4 x e e^a_I e^b_J {F_{ab}}^{IJ} [A]$$

where $F$ is the curvature of the $A$, the self-dual part of $\omega$,

$$A_a^{IJ} = {1 \over 2} \left (\omega_a^{IJ} - {i \over 2} {\varepsilon^{IJ}}_{MN} \omega_a^{MN} \right ).$$

It has been shown that $F[A]$ is the self-dual part of $\Omega [\omega].$

Let $q^a_b = \delta^a_b + n^a n_b$ be the projector onto the three surface and define vector fields

$$E^a_I = q^a_b e^b_I,$$

which are orthogonal to $n^a$.

Writing

$$E^a_I = \left (\delta_b^a + n_b n^a \right ) e^b_I$$

then we can write

$$\begin{align}
\int & d^4 x  \left (e E^a_I E^b_J {F_{ab}}^{IJ} - 2 e E^a_I e^d_J n_d n^b {F_{ab}}^{IJ} \right) = \\
&= \int d^4 x \left (e \left (\delta_c^a + n_c n^a \right ) e^c_I \left (\delta_d^b + n_d n^b \right ) e^d_J {F_{ab}}^{IJ} - 2 e \left (\delta_c^a + n_c n^a \right ) e^c_I e^d_J n_d n^b {F_{ab}}^{IJ} \right ) \\
&= \int d^4 x \left (e e^a_I e^b_J {F_{ab}}^{IJ} + e n_c n^a e^c_I e^b_J {F_{ab}}^{IJ} + e e^a_I n_d n^b e^d_J {F_{ab}}^{IJ} + e n_c n^a n_d n^b E^c_I E^d_J {F_{ab}}^{IJ} - 2e e^a_I e^d_J n_d n^b {F_{ab}}^{IJ} - 2 n_c n^a e^c_I e^d_J n_d n^b {F_{ab}}^{IJ} \right) \\
&= \int d^4 x e e^a_I e^b_J {F_{ab}}^{IJ} \\
&= S(E,A)
\end{align}$$

where we used ${F_{ab}}^{IJ} = {F_{ba}}^{JI}$ and $n^a n^b F_{ab}^i = 0$.

So the action can be written

$$S(E,A) = \int d^4 x \left (e E^a_I E^b_J {F_{ab}}^{IJ} - 2 e E^a_I e^d_J n_d n^b {F_{ab}}^{IJ} \right) \qquad  Eq. 12$$

We have $e = N \sqrt{q}$. We now define

$$\tilde{E}_I^a = \sqrt{q} E_I^a$$

An internal tensor $S^{IJ}$ is self-dual if and only if

$$*S^{IJ} := {1 \over 2} {\varepsilon^{IJ}}_{MN} S^{MN} = i S^{IJ}$$

and given the curvature ${F_{ab}}^{IJ}$ is self-dual we have

$${F_{ab}}^{IJ} = -i {1 \over 2} {\varepsilon^{IJ}}_{MN} {F_{ab}}^{MN}$$

Substituting this into the action (Eq. 12) we have,

$$S(E,A) = \int d^4 x \left (-i \frac{1}{2} \left (\frac{N}{\sqrt{q}} \right ) \tilde{E}^a_I \tilde{E}^b_J {\varepsilon^{IJ}}_{MN} {F_{ab}}^{MN}-2 N n^b \tilde{E}^a_I n_J {F_{ab}}^{IJ} \right )$$

where we denoted $n_J = e_J^d n_d$. We pick the gauge $\tilde{E}^a_0 = 0$ and $n^I = \delta_0^I$ (this means $n_I = \eta_{IJ} n^J = \eta_{00} \delta_0^I = - \delta_0^I$). Writing $\varepsilon_{IJKL} n^L = \varepsilon_{IJK}$, which in this gauge $\varepsilon_{IJK0} = \varepsilon_{IJK}$. Therefore,

$$\begin{align}
S(E,A) &= \int d^4 x \left (- i {1 \over 2} \left ({N \over \sqrt{q}} \right ) \tilde{E}^a_I \tilde{E}^b_J \left ({\varepsilon^{IJ}}_{M0} {F_{ab}}^{M0} + {\varepsilon^{IJ}}_{0M} {F_{ab}}^{0M} \right ) - 2 N n^b \tilde{E}^a_I n_J {F_{ab}}^{IJ} \right) \\
&= \int d^4 x \left (- i \left ({N \over \sqrt{q}} \right ) \tilde{E}^a_I \tilde{E}^b_J {\varepsilon^{IJ}}_{M} {F_{ab}}^{M0} + 2 N n^b \tilde{E}^a_I {F_{ab}}^{I0} \right )
\end{align}$$

The indices $I,J,M$ range over $1,2,3$ and we denote them with lower case letters in a moment. By the self-duality of $A_a^{IJ}$,

$$A_a^{i0} = - i {1 \over 2} {\varepsilon^{i0}}_{jk} A_a^{jk} = i {1 \over 2} {\varepsilon^i}_{jk} A_a^{jk}= i A_a^i.$$

where we used

$${\varepsilon^{i0}}_{jk} = -{\varepsilon^i}_{0jk} = -{\varepsilon^i}_{jk0} = -{\varepsilon^i}_{jk}.$$

This implies

$$\begin{align}
{F_{ab}}^{i0} &= \partial_a A_b^{i0} - \partial_b A_a^{i0} + A_a^{ik} {A_{bk}}^{0} - A_b^{ik} {A_{ak}}^{0} \\
&= i \left (\partial_a A_b^i - \partial_b A_a^i + A_a^{ik} A_{bk} - A_b^{ik} A_{ak} \right ) \\
&= i \left (\partial_a A_b^i - \partial_b A_a^i + \varepsilon_{ijk} A_a^j A_b^k \right ) \\
&= i F_{ab}^i
\end{align}$$

We replace in the second term in the action $N n^b$ by $t^b - n^b$. We need

$$\mathcal{L}_t A_b^i = t^a \partial_a A_b^i + A_a^i \partial_b t^a$$

and

$$\mathcal{D}_b \left (t^a A_a^i \right ) = \partial_b \left (t^a A_a^i \right ) + \varepsilon_{ijk} A^j_b \left (t^a A_a^k \right )$$

to obtain

$$\mathcal{L}_t A_b^i - \mathcal{D}_b \left (t^a A_a^i \right ) = t^a \left (\partial_a A_b^i - \partial_b A_a^i + \varepsilon_{ijk} A_a^j A^k_b \right ) = t^a F_{ab}^i.$$

The action becomes

$$\begin{align}
S &= \int d^4 x \left (- i \left ({N \over \sqrt{q}} \right ) \tilde{E}^a_I \tilde{E}^b_J {\varepsilon^{IJ}}_{M} {F_{ab}}^{M0} - 2 \left (t^a - N^a \right ) \tilde{E}^b_I {F_{ab}}^{I0} \right ) \\
&= \int d^4 x \left (- 2 i \tilde{E}_i^b \mathcal{L}_t A_b^i + 2 i \tilde{E}_i^b \mathcal{D}_b \left (t^a A_a^i \right ) + 2 i N^a \tilde{E}^b_i F_{ab}^i - \left ({N \over \sqrt{q}} \right ) \varepsilon_{ijk} \tilde{E}^a_i \tilde{E}^b_j F_{ab}^k \right )
\end{align}$$

where we swapped the dummy variables $a$ and $b$ in the second term of the first line. Integrating by parts on the second term,

$$\begin{align}
\int d^4 x \tilde{E}_i^b \mathcal{D}_b \left (t^a A_a^i \right ) &= \int dt d^3 x \tilde{E}_i^b \left (\partial_b (t^a A_a^i) + \varepsilon_{ijk} A_b^j (t^a A_a^k) \right ) \\
&= - \int dt d^3 x t^a A_a^i \left (\partial_b \tilde{E}_i^b + \varepsilon_{ijk} A_b^j \tilde{E}_k^b \right ) \\
&= - \int d^4 x t^a A_a^i \mathcal{D}_b \tilde{E}_i^b
\end{align}$$

where we have thrown away the boundary term and where we used the formula for the covariant derivative on a vector density $\tilde{V}_i^b$:

$$\mathcal{D}_b \tilde{V}_i^b = \partial_b \tilde{V}_i^b + \varepsilon_{ijk} A_b^j \tilde{V}_k^b .$$

The final form of the action we require is

$$S = \int d^4 x \left (- 2 i \tilde{E}_i^b \mathcal{L}_t A_b^i - 2 i \left (t^a A_a^i \right ) \mathcal{D}_b \tilde{E}_i^b + 2 i N^a \tilde{E}^b_i F_{ab}^i + \left ({N \over \sqrt{q}} \right ) \varepsilon_{ijk} \tilde{E}^a_i \tilde{E}^b_j F_{ab}^k \right )$$

There is a term of the form "$p \dot{q}$" thus the quantity $\tilde{E}_i^a$ is the conjugate momentum to $A_a^i$. Hence, we can immediately write

$$\left \{ A_a^i (x), \tilde{E}_j^b (y) \right \} = {i \over 2} \delta^b_a \delta^i_j \delta^3 (x,y) .$$

Variation of action with respect to the non-dynamical quantities $(t^a A_a^i)$, that is the time component of the four-connection, the shift function $N^b$, and lapse function $N$ give the constraints

$$\mathcal{D}_a \tilde{E}_i^a = 0  ,$$

$$F_{ab}^i \tilde{E}^b_i = 0 ,$$

$$\varepsilon_{ijk} \tilde{E}^a_i \tilde{E}^b_j F_{ab}^k = 0  \qquad Eq. 13.$$

Varying with respect to $N$ actually gives the last constraint in Eq. 13 divided by $\sqrt{q}$, it has been rescaled to make the constraint polynomial in the fundamental variables. The connection $A_a^i$ can be written

$$A^i_a = {1 \over 2} {\varepsilon^{i}}_{jk} A^{jk}_a = {1 \over 2} {\varepsilon^i}_{jk} \left ( \omega^{jk}_a - i {1 \over 2}
\left ({\varepsilon^{jk}}_{m0}  \omega^{m0}_a + {\varepsilon^{jk}}_{0m} \omega^{0m}_a \right) \right) = \Gamma_a^i - i \omega^{0i}_a$$

and

$$E_{ci} \omega^{0i}_a = -q^b_a E_{ci} \omega_b^{i0} = -q^b_a E_{ci} e^{di} \nabla_b e_d^0 = q^b_a q^d_c \nabla_b n_d = K_{ac}$$

where we used

$$e^0_d = \eta^{0I} g_{dc} e_I^c = -g_{dc} e_0^c = -n_d,$$

therefore $\omega^{0i}_a = K_a^i$. So the connection reads

$$A_a^i = \Gamma_a^i - i K_a^i .$$

This is the so-called chiral spin connection.

== Reality conditions ==
Because Ashtekar's variables are complex it results in complex general relativity. To recover the real theory one has to impose what are known as the reality conditions. These require that the densitized triad be real and that the real part of the Ashtekar connection equals the compatible spin connection.

More to be said on this, later.

== See also ==
- Lie algebra
- Plebanski action
- BF model
