= BF model =

Topological field

The BF model or BF theory is a topological field, which when quantized, becomes a topological quantum field theory. BF stands for background field B and F, as can be seen below, are also the variables appearing in the Lagrangian of the theory, which is helpful as a mnemonic device.

We have a 4-dimensional differentiable manifold M, a gauge group G, which has as "dynamical" fields a 2-form B taking values in the adjoint representation of G, and a connection form A for G.

The action is given by

$$S=\int_M K[\mathbf{B}\wedge \mathbf{F}]$$

where K is an invariant nondegenerate bilinear form over $\mathfrak{g}$ (if G is semisimple, the Killing form will do) and F is the curvature form

$$\mathbf{F}\equiv d\mathbf{A}+\mathbf{A}\wedge \mathbf{A}$$

This action is diffeomorphically invariant and gauge invariant. Its Euler–Lagrange equations are

$\mathbf{F}=0$ (no curvature)

and

$d_\mathbf{A}\mathbf{B}=0$ (the covariant exterior derivative of B is zero).

In fact, it is always possible to gauge away any local degrees of freedom, which is why it is called a topological field theory.

However, if M is topologically nontrivial, A and B can have nontrivial solutions globally.

In fact, BF theory can be used to formulate discrete gauge theory. One can add additional twist terms allowed by group cohomology theory such as Dijkgraaf–Witten topological gauge theory. There are many kinds of modified BF theories as topological theories, which give rise to link invariants in 3 dimensions, 4 dimensions, and other general dimensions.

== See also ==
- Background field method
- Barrett–Crane model
- Dual graviton
- Plebanski action
- Spin foam
- Tetradic Palatini action
