= Plebanski action =

Construction in relativity

General relativity and supergravity in all dimensions meet each other at a common assumption:

Any configuration space can be coordinatized by gauge fields $A^i_a$, where the index $i$ is a Lie algebra index and $a$ is a spatial manifold index.

Using these assumptions one can construct an effective field theory in low energies for both. In this form the action of general relativity can be written in the form of the Plebanski action which can be constructed using the Palatini action to derive Einstein's field equations of general relativity.

The form of the action introduced by Plebanski is:

$$S_\mathrm{Plebanski} = \int_{\Sigma \times R} \epsilon_{ijkl} B^{ij} \wedge F^{kl} (A^i_a) + \phi_{ijkl} B^{ij} \wedge B^{kl}$$

where

$i, j, l, k$

are internal indices,$F$ is a curvature on the orthogonal group $SO(3, 1)$ and the connection variables (the gauge fields) are denoted by $A^i_a$. The symbol $\phi_{ijkl}$ is the Lagrangian multiplier and $\epsilon_{ijkl}$ is the antisymmetric symbol valued over $SO(3, 1)$.

The specific definition

$$B^{ij} = e^i \wedge e^j$$

formally satisfies the Einstein's field equation of general relativity.

Application is to the Barrett–Crane model.

== See also ==
- Tetradic Palatini action
- Barrett–Crane model
- BF model
