= Attilio Palatini =

Italian mathematician (1889–1949)

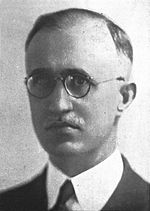
- Born: 18 November 1889; Treviso, Italy
- Died: 24 August 1949 (aged 59); Rome, Italy
- Education: University of Padua
- Known for: Palatini identity Calculus of variations Palatini variation
- Scientific career
- Fields: Mathematics
- Doctoral advisor: Tullio Levi-Civita

Attilio Palatini (18 November 1889 – 24 August 1949) was an Italian mathematician born in Treviso.

== Biography ==
Palatini was the seventh of the eight children of Michele (1855-1914) and Ilde Furlanetto (1856-1895). In 1900, during the celebrations for the election of his father to Parliament, he was blinded by a young man from Treviso, losing the use of one eye. He completed his secondary studies in Treviso. He graduated in mathematics in 1913 at the University of Padua, where he was a student of Ricci-Curbastro and of Levi-Civita.

He taught rational mechanics at the Universities of Messina, Parma and Pavia. He was mainly involved in absolute differential calculus and in general relativity. Within this latter subject he gave a sound generalization of the variational principle.

In 1919, Palatini wrote an important article where he proposed a new approach to the variational formulation of Einstein's gravitational field equations. In the same paper, Palatini also showed that the variations of Christoffel symbols constitute the coordinate components of a tensor.

He wrote the "Rational Mechanics" and "Theory of relativity" entries for the Hoepli Encyclopedia of Elementary mathematics.

== See also ==
- Self-dual Palatini action
- Tetradic Palatini action
- Palatini identity
- Palatini variation
