= Dirac equation in curved spacetime =

Generalization of the Dirac equation

In mathematical physics, the Dirac equation in curved spacetime is a generalization of the Dirac equation from flat spacetime (Minkowski space) to curved spacetime, a general Lorentzian manifold.

== Mathematical formulation ==
=== Spacetime ===
In full generality the equation can be defined on $M$ or $(M,\mathbf{g})$ a pseudo-Riemannian manifold, but for concreteness we restrict to pseudo-Riemannian manifold with signature $(- + + +)$. The metric is referred to as $\mathbf{g}$, or $g_{ab}$ in abstract index notation.

=== Frame fields ===
We use a set of vierbein or frame fields $\{e_\mu\} = \{e_0,e_1,e_2,e_3\}$, which are a set of vector fields (which are not necessarily defined globally on $M$). Their defining equation is

$$g_{ab}e_\mu^a e_\nu^b = \eta_{\mu\nu}.$$

The vierbein defines a local rest frame, allowing the constant Gamma matrices to act at each spacetime point.

In differential-geometric language, the vierbein is equivalent to a section of the frame bundle, and so defines a local trivialization of the frame bundle.

=== Spin connection ===
To write down the equation we also need the spin connection, also known as the connection (1-)form. The dual frame fields $\{e^\mu\}$ have defining relation

$$e^\mu_a e^a_\nu = \delta^\mu{}_\nu.$$

The connection 1-form is then

$$\omega^\mu{}_{\nu a} := e^\mu_b\nabla_a e^b_\nu$$

where $\nabla_a$ is a covariant derivative, or equivalently a choice of connection on the frame bundle, most often taken to be the Levi-Civita connection.

One should be careful not to treat the abstract Latin indices and Greek indices as the same, and further to note that neither of these are coordinate indices: it can be verified that $\omega^\mu{}_{\nu a}$ doesn't transform as a tensor under a change of coordinates.

Mathematically, the frame fields $\{e_\mu\}$ define an isomorphism at each point $p$ where they are defined from the tangent space $T_pM$ to $\mathbb{R}^{1,3}$. Then abstract indices label the tangent space, while greek indices label $\mathbb{R}^{1,3}$. If the frame fields are position dependent then greek indices do not necessarily transform tensorially under a change of coordinates.

Raising and lowering indices is done with $g_{ab}$ for latin indices and $\eta_{\mu\nu}$ for greek indices.

The connection form can be viewed as a more abstract connection on a principal bundle, specifically on the frame bundle, which is defined on any smooth manifold, but which restricts to an orthonormal frame bundle on pseudo-Riemannian manifolds.

The connection form with respect to frame fields $\{e_\mu\}$ defined locally is, in differential-geometric language, the connection with respect to a local trivialization.

=== Clifford algebra ===
Just as with the Dirac equation on flat spacetime, we make use of the Clifford algebra, a set of four gamma matrices $\{\gamma^\mu\}$ satisfying

$$\{\gamma^\mu,\gamma^\nu\} = 2\eta^{\mu\nu}$$

where $\{\cdot,\cdot\}$ is the anticommutator.

They can be used to construct a representation of the Lorentz algebra: defining

$$\sigma^{\mu\nu} = -\frac{i}{4}[\gamma^\mu,\gamma^\nu] = -\frac{i}{2}\gamma^\mu\gamma^\nu + \frac{i}{2}\eta^{\mu\nu}$$,

where $[\cdot,\cdot]$ is the commutator.

It can be shown they satisfy the commutation relations of the Lorentz algebra:

$$[\sigma^{\mu\nu},\sigma^{\rho\sigma}] = (-i)(\sigma^{\mu\sigma}\eta^{\nu\rho} - \sigma^{\nu\sigma}\eta^{\mu\rho} + \sigma^{\nu\rho}\eta^{\mu\sigma} - \sigma^{\mu\rho}\eta^{\nu\sigma})$$

They therefore are the generators of a representation of the Lorentz algebra $\mathfrak{so}(1,3)$. But they do not generate a representation of the Lorentz group $\text{SO}(1,3)$, just as the Pauli matrices generate a representation of the rotation algebra $\mathfrak{so}(3)$ but not $\text{SO}(3)$. They in fact form a representation of $\text{Spin}(1,3).$ However, it is a standard abuse of terminology to any representations of the Lorentz algebra as representations of the Lorentz group, even if they do not arise as representations of the Lorentz group.

The representation space is isomorphic to $\mathbb{C}^4$ as a vector space. In the classification of Lorentz group representations, the representation is labelled $\left(\frac{1}{2},0\right)\oplus\left(0,\frac{1}{2}\right)$.

The abuse of terminology extends to forming this representation at the group level. We can write a finite Lorentz transformation on $\mathbb{R}^{1,3}$ as $\Lambda^\rho_\sigma = \exp\left(\frac{i}{2}\alpha_{\mu\nu}M^{\mu\nu}\right){}^\rho_\sigma$ where $M^{\mu\nu}$ is the standard basis for the Lorentz algebra. These generators have components

$$(M^{\mu\nu})^\rho_\sigma = \eta^{\mu\rho}\delta^\nu_\sigma - \eta^{\nu\rho}\delta^\mu_\sigma$$

or, with both indices up or both indices down, simply matrices which have $+1$ in the $\mu,\nu$ index and $-1$ in the $\nu,\mu$ index, and 0 everywhere else.

If another representation $\rho$ has generators $T^{\mu\nu} = \rho(M^{\mu\nu}),$ then we write

$$\rho(\Lambda)^i_j = \exp\left(\frac{i}{2}\alpha_{\mu\nu}T^{\mu\nu}\right){}^i_j$$

where $i,j$ are indices for the representation space.

In the case $T^{\mu\nu} = \sigma^{\mu\nu}$, without being given generator components $\alpha_{\mu\nu}$ for $\Lambda^\rho_\sigma$, this $\rho(\Lambda)$ is not well defined: there are sets of generator components $\alpha_{\mu\nu}, \beta_{\mu\nu}$ which give the same $\Lambda^\rho_\sigma$ but different $\rho(\Lambda)^i_j.$

=== Covariant derivative for fields in a representation of the Lorentz group ===
Given a coordinate frame ${\partial_\alpha}$ arising from say coordinates $\{x^\alpha\}$, the partial derivative with respect to a general orthonormal frame $\{e_\mu\}$ is defined

$$\partial_\mu\psi = e^\alpha_\mu\partial_\alpha\psi,$$

and connection components with respect to a general orthonormal frame are

$$\omega^\mu{}_{\nu\rho} = e^\alpha_\rho\omega^\mu{}_{\nu\alpha}.$$

These components do not transform tensorially under a change of frame, but do when combined. Also, these are definitions rather than saying that these objects can arise as partial derivatives in some coordinate chart. In general there are non-coordinate orthonormal frames, for which the commutator of vector fields is non-vanishing.

It can be checked that under the transformation

$$\psi \mapsto \rho(\Lambda)\psi,$$

if we define the covariant derivative

$$D_\mu\psi = \partial_\mu\psi + \frac{1}{2}(\omega_{\nu\rho})_\mu \sigma^{\nu\rho}\psi$$,

then $D_\mu\psi$ transforms as

$$D_\mu\psi \mapsto \rho(\Lambda)D_\mu\psi$$

This generalises to any representation $R$ for the Lorentz group: if $v$ is a vector field for the associated representation,

$$D_\mu v = \partial_\mu v + \frac{1}{2}(\omega_{\nu\rho})_\mu R(M^{\nu\rho})v = \partial_\mu v + \frac{1}{2}(\omega_{\nu\rho})_\mu T^{\nu\rho}v.$$

When $R$ is the fundamental representation for $\text{SO}(1,3)$, this recovers the familiar covariant derivative for (tangent-)vector fields, of which the Levi-Civita connection is an example.

There are some subtleties in what kind of mathematical object the different types of covariant derivative are. The covariant derivative $D_\alpha \psi$ in a coordinate basis is a vector-valued 1-form, which at each point $p$ is an element of $E_p\otimes T^*_pM$. The covariant derivative $D_\mu\psi$ in an orthonormal basis uses the orthonormal frame $\{e_\mu\}$ to identify the vector-valued 1-form with a vector-valued dual vector which at each point $p$ is an element of $E_p \otimes \mathbb{R}^{1,3},$ using that ${\mathbb{R}^{1,3}}^* \cong \mathbb{R}^{1,3}$ canonically. We can then contract this with a gamma matrix 4-vector $\gamma^\mu$ which takes values at $p$ in $\text{End}(E_p)\otimes \mathbb{R}^{1,3}$

== Dirac equation on curved spacetime ==
Recalling the Dirac equation on flat spacetime,

$$(i\gamma^\mu\partial_\mu - m)\psi = 0,$$

the Dirac equation on curved spacetime can be written down by promoting the partial derivative to a covariant one.

In this way, Dirac's equation takes the following form in curved spacetime:

Dirac equation on curved spacetime

$(i\gamma^\mu D_\mu - m)\Psi = 0.$

where $\Psi$ is a spinor field on spacetime. Mathematically, this is a section of a vector bundle associated to the spin-frame bundle by the representation $(1/2,0)\oplus(0,1/2).$

=== Recovering the Klein–Gordon equation from the Dirac equation ===
The modified Klein–Gordon equation obtained by squaring the operator in the Dirac equation, first found by Erwin Schrödinger as cited by Pollock is given by

$$\left(\frac{1}{\sqrt{-\det g}}\, {\cal D}_\mu \left(\sqrt{-\det g}\, g^{\mu\nu}{\cal D}_\nu\right)- \frac{1}{4} R + \frac{i e}{2} F_{\mu\nu} s^{\mu\nu} - m^2\right)\Psi=0.$$

where $R$ is the Ricci scalar, and $F_{\mu\nu}$ is the field strength of $A_\mu$. An alternative version of the Dirac equation whose Dirac operator remains the square root of the Laplacian is given by the Dirac–Kähler equation; the price to pay is the loss of Lorentz invariance in curved spacetime.

Note that here Latin indices denote the "Lorentzian" vierbein labels while Greek indices denote manifold coordinate indices.

== Action formulation ==
We can formulate this theory in terms of an action. If in addition the spacetime $(M,\mathbf{g})$ is orientable, there is a preferred orientation known as the volume form $\epsilon$. One can integrate functions against the volume form:

$$\int_M \epsilon f = \int_M d^4 x\sqrt{-g}f$$

The function $\bar\Psi(i\gamma^\mu D_\mu - m)\Psi$ is integrated against the volume form to obtain the Dirac action

Dirac action on curved spacetime

$I_{\text{Dirac}} = \int_M d^4 x \sqrt{-g}\,\bar\Psi(i\gamma^\mu D_\mu - m)\Psi.$

== See also ==
- Dirac equation in the algebra of physical space
- Dirac spinor
- Maxwell's equations in curved spacetime
- Two-body Dirac equations
