= Barrett–Crane model =

Model of quantum gravity

The Barrett–Crane model is a model in quantum gravity, first published in 1998, which was defined using the Plebanski action.

The $B$ field in the action is supposed to be a $so(3, 1)$-valued 2-form, i.e. taking values in the Lie algebra of a special orthogonal group. The term

$$B^{ij} \wedge B^{kl}$$

in the action has the same symmetries as it does to provide the Einstein–Hilbert action. But the form of

$$B^{ij}$$

is not unique and can be posed by the different forms:

- $\pm e^i \wedge e^j$
- $\pm \epsilon^{ijkl} e_k \wedge e_l$

where $e^i$ is the tetrad and $\epsilon^{ijkl}$ is the antisymmetric symbol of the $so(3, 1)$-valued 2-form fields.

The Plebanski action can be constrained to produce the BF model which is a theory of no local degrees of freedom. John W. Barrett and Louis Crane modeled the analogous constraint on the summation over spin foam.

The Barrett–Crane model on spin foam quantizes the Plebanski action, but its path integral amplitude corresponds to the degenerate $B$ field and not the specific definition

$$B^{ij} = e^i \wedge e^j$$,

which formally satisfies the Einstein's field equation of general relativity. However, if analysed with the tools of loop quantum gravity the Barrett–Crane model gives an incorrect long-distance limit , and so the model is not identical to loop quantum gravity.
