= Palatini identity =

Variation of the Ricci tensor with respect to the metric

In general relativity and tensor calculus, the Palatini identity is

$$\delta R_{\sigma\nu} = \nabla_\rho \delta \Gamma^\rho_{\nu\sigma} - \nabla_\nu \delta \Gamma^\rho_{\rho\sigma},$$

where $\delta \Gamma^\rho_{\nu\sigma}$ denotes the variation of Christoffel symbols and $\nabla_\rho$ indicates covariant differentiation.

The "same" identity holds for the Lie derivative $\mathcal{L}_{\xi} R_{\sigma\nu}$. In fact, one has

$$\mathcal{L}_{\xi} R_{\sigma\nu} = \nabla_\rho (\mathcal{L}_{\xi} \Gamma^\rho_{\nu\sigma}) - \nabla_\nu (\mathcal{L}_{\xi} \Gamma^\rho_{\rho\sigma}),$$

where $\xi = \xi^{\rho}\partial_{\rho}$ denotes any vector field on the spacetime manifold $M$.

== Proof ==
The Riemann curvature tensor is defined in terms of the Levi-Civita connection $\Gamma^\lambda_{\mu\nu}$ as

$${R^\rho}_{\sigma\mu\nu} = \partial_\mu\Gamma^\rho_{\nu\sigma} - \partial_\nu\Gamma^\rho_{\mu\sigma} + \Gamma^\rho_{\mu\lambda} \Gamma^\lambda_{\nu\sigma} - \Gamma^\rho_{\nu\lambda}\Gamma^\lambda_{\mu\sigma}$$.

Its variation is

$$\delta{R^\rho}_{\sigma\mu\nu} =
\partial_\mu \delta\Gamma^\rho_{\nu\sigma} - \partial_\nu \delta\Gamma^\rho_{\mu\sigma} + \delta\Gamma^\rho_{\mu\lambda} \Gamma^\lambda_{\nu\sigma} + \Gamma^\rho_{\mu\lambda} \delta\Gamma^\lambda_{\nu\sigma} - \delta\Gamma^\rho_{\nu\lambda} \Gamma^\lambda_{\mu\sigma} - \Gamma^\rho_{\nu\lambda} \delta\Gamma^\lambda_{\mu\sigma}$$.

While the connection $\Gamma^\rho_{\nu\sigma}$ is not a tensor, the difference $\delta\Gamma^\rho_{\nu\sigma}$ between two connections is, so we can take its covariant derivative

$$\nabla_\mu \delta \Gamma^\rho_{\nu\sigma} =
\partial_\mu \delta \Gamma^\rho_{\nu\sigma} + \Gamma^\rho_{\mu\lambda} \delta \Gamma^\lambda_{\nu\sigma} - \Gamma^\lambda_{\mu\nu} \delta \Gamma^\rho_{\lambda\sigma} - \Gamma^\lambda_{\mu\sigma} \delta \Gamma^\rho_{\nu\lambda}$$.

Solving this equation for $\partial_\mu \delta \Gamma^\rho_{\nu\sigma}$ and substituting the result in $\delta{R^\rho}_{\sigma\mu\nu}$, all the $\Gamma \delta \Gamma$-like terms cancel, leaving only

$$\delta{R^\rho}_{\sigma\mu\nu} =
\nabla_\mu \delta\Gamma^\rho_{\nu\sigma} - \nabla_\nu \delta\Gamma^\rho_{\mu\sigma}$$.

Finally, the variation of the Ricci curvature tensor follows by contracting two indices, proving the identity

$$\delta R_{\sigma\nu} = \delta {R^\rho}_{\sigma\rho\nu} =
\nabla_\rho \delta \Gamma^\rho_{\nu\sigma} - \nabla_\nu \delta \Gamma^\rho_{\rho\sigma}$$.

== See also ==
- Einstein–Hilbert action
- Palatini variation
- Ricci calculus
- Tensor calculus
- Christoffel symbols
- Riemann curvature tensor
