= Spin connection =

Connection on a spinor bundle

In differential geometry and mathematical physics, a spin connection is a connection on a spinor bundle. It is induced, in a canonical manner, from the affine connection. It can also be regarded as the gauge field generated by local Lorentz transformations. In some canonical formulations of general relativity, a spin connection is defined on spatial slices and can also be regarded as the gauge field generated by local rotations.

The spin connection occurs in two common forms: the Levi-Civita spin connection, when it is derived from the Levi-Civita connection, and the affine spin connection, when it is obtained from the affine connection. The difference between the two of these is that the Levi-Civita connection is by definition the unique torsion-free and metric-preserving connection, whereas the affine connection (and so the affine spin connection) may contain torsion.

== Definition ==
Let $e_\mu^{\;\,a}$ be the local Lorentz frame fields or vierbein (also known as a tetrad), which is a set of orthonormal space time vector fields that diagonalize the metric tensor
$$g_{\mu \nu} = e_\mu^{\;\,a} e_\nu^{\;\,b} \eta_{ab},$$
where $g_{\mu \nu}$ is the spacetime metric and $\eta_{ab}$ is the Minkowski metric. Here, Latin letters denote the local Lorentz frame indices; Greek indices denote general coordinate indices. This simply expresses that $g_{\mu \nu}$, when written in terms of the basis $e_\mu^{\;\,a}$, is locally flat. The Greek vierbein indices can be raised or lowered by the metric, i.e. $g^{\mu \nu}$ or $g_{\mu \nu}$. The Latin or "Lorentzian" vierbein indices can be raised or lowered by $\eta^{ab}$ or $\eta_{ab}$ respectively. For example, $e^{\mu a}=g^{\mu\nu} e_\nu^{\;\,a}$ and $e_{\nu a}=\eta_{ab} e_{\nu}^{\;\,b}$

The torsion-free spin connection is given by
$$\omega_{\mu}^{\ ab}=e_\nu^{\ a}  \Gamma^\nu_{\ \sigma\mu}e^{\sigma b} + e_\nu^{\ a} \partial_\mu e^{\nu b} = e_\nu^{\ a} \Gamma^\nu_{\ \sigma\mu}e^{\sigma b} - e^{\nu b} \partial_\mu e_\nu ^{\ a},$$
where $\Gamma^\sigma_{\mu\nu}$ are the Christoffel symbols. This definition should be taken as defining the torsion-free spin connection, since, by convention, the Christoffel symbols are derived from the Levi-Civita connection, which is the unique metric compatible, torsion-free connection on a Riemannian Manifold. In general, there is no restriction: the spin connection may also contain torsion.

Note that $\omega_{\mu}^{\ ab}=e_\nu^{\ a} \partial_{;\mu} e^{\nu b}=e_\nu^{\ a} ( \partial_\mu e^{\nu b}+\Gamma^\nu_{\ \sigma\mu}e^{\sigma b})$ using the gravitational covariant derivative $\partial_{;\mu} e^{\nu b}$ of the contravariant vector $e^{\nu b}$. The spin connection may be written purely in terms of the vierbein field as
$$\omega_{\mu}^{\ ab} = \tfrac{1}{2} e^{\nu a} (\partial_\mu e_\nu^{\ b}-\partial_\nu e_\mu^{\ b}) - \tfrac{1}{2} e^{\nu b}(\partial_\mu e_\nu^{\ a}-\partial_\nu e_\mu^{\ a}) - \tfrac{1}{2} e^{\rho a}e^{\sigma b}(\partial_\rho e_{\sigma c}-\partial_\sigma e_{\rho c})e_\mu^{\ c},$$
which by definition is anti-symmetric in its internal indices $a, b$.

The spin connection $\omega_\mu^{\ ab}$ defines a covariant derivative $D_\mu$ on generalized tensors. For example, its action on $V_\nu^{\ a}$ is
$$D_\mu V_\nu^{\ a} = \partial_\mu V_\nu^{\ a} + {{\omega_\mu}^a}_b V_\nu^{\ b} - \Gamma^\sigma_{\ \nu \mu} V_\sigma^{\ a}$$

== Cartan's structure equations ==
In the Cartan formalism, the spin connection is used to define both torsion and curvature. These are easiest to read by working with differential forms, as this hides some of the profusion of indexes. The equations presented here are effectively a restatement of those that can be found in the article on the connection form and the curvature form. The primary difference is that these retain the indexes on the vierbein, instead of completely hiding them. More narrowly, the Cartan formalism is to be interpreted in its historical setting, as a generalization of the idea of an affine connection to a homogeneous space; it is not yet as general as the idea of a principal connection on a fiber bundle. It serves as a suitable half-way point between the narrower setting in Riemannian geometry and the fully abstract fiber bundle setting, thus emphasizing the similarity to gauge theory. Note that Cartan's structure equations, as expressed here, have a direct analog: the Maurer–Cartan equations for Lie groups (that is, they are the same equations, but in a different setting and notation).

Writing the vierbeins as differential forms
$$e^a = e_\mu^{\;\,a} dx^\mu$$
for the orthonormal coordinates on the cotangent bundle, the affine spin connection one-form is
$$\omega^{ab} = \omega_\mu^{\;\;ab} dx^\mu$$
The torsion 2-form is given by
$$\Theta^a = de^a + \omega^a_{\;b} \wedge e^b$$
while the curvature 2-form is
$$R^a_{\;\,b} = d\omega^a_{\;\,b} + \omega^a_{\;c} \wedge \omega^c_{\;\,b}
= \tfrac{1}{2}R^a_{\;\,bcd}e^c\wedge e^d$$
These two equations, taken together are called Cartan's structure equations. Consistency requires that the Bianchi identities be obeyed. The first Bianchi identity is obtained by taking the exterior derivative of the torsion:
$$d\Theta^a + \omega^a_{\;b} \wedge \Theta^b = R^a_{\;\,b} \wedge e^b$$
while the second by differentiating the curvature:
$$dR^a_{\;\,b} + \omega^a_{\;c} \wedge R^c_{\;\,b} - R^a_{\;\,c} \wedge \omega^c_{\;b} = 0.$$
The covariant derivative for a generic differential form $V^a_{\;\,b}$ of degree p is defined by
$$DV^a_{\;\,b}= dV^a_{\;\,b} + \omega^a_{\;c} \wedge V^c_{\;\,b} - (-1)^p V^a_{\;\,c} \wedge \omega^c_{\;b}.$$
Bianchi's second identity then becomes
$$DR^a_{\;\,b}=0.$$
The difference between a connection with torsion, and the unique torsionless connection is given by the contorsion tensor. Connections with torsion are commonly found in theories of teleparallelism, Einstein–Cartan theory, gauge theory gravity and supergravity.

== Derivation ==
=== Metricity ===
It is easy to deduce by raising and lowering indices as needed that the frame fields defined by $g_{\mu \nu} = {e_\mu}^a {e_\nu}^b \eta_{ab}$ will also satisfy ${e_\mu}^a {e^\mu}_b = \delta^a_b$ and ${e_\mu}^b {e^\nu}_b = \delta^\nu_\mu$. We expect that $D_\mu$ will also annihilate the Minkowski metric $\eta_{ab}$,
$$D_\mu \eta_{ab} = \partial_\mu \eta_{ab} - {\omega_{\mu a}}^{c} \eta_{cb} - {\omega_{\mu b}}^{c} \eta_{ac} = 0.$$
This implies that the connection is anti-symmetric in its internal indices, ${\omega_{\mu}}^{ab} = - {\omega_{\mu}}^{ba}.$ This is also deduced by taking the gravitational covariant derivative $\partial_{;\beta}({e_\mu}^a {e^\mu}_b) = 0$ which implies that $\partial_{;\beta}{e_\mu}^a {e^\mu}_b = -{e_\mu}^a \partial_{;\beta}{e^\mu}_b$ thus ultimately, ${\omega_{\beta}}^{ab} = -{\omega_{\beta}}^{ba}$. This is sometimes called the metricity condition; it is analogous to the more commonly stated metricity condition that $g_{\mu\nu;\alpha}=0.$ Note that this condition holds only for the Levi-Civita spin connection, and not for the affine spin connection in general.

By substituting the formula for the Christoffel symbols ${\Gamma^\nu}_{\sigma \mu} = \tfrac{1}{2} g^{\nu \delta} \left(\partial_\sigma g_{\delta \mu} + \partial_\mu g_{\sigma \delta} - \partial_\delta g_{\sigma \mu}\right)$ written in terms of the ${e_\mu}^a$, the spin connection can be written entirely in terms of the ${e_\mu}^a$,
$${\omega_{\mu}}^{ab} = e^{\nu [a} ({{e_\nu}^{b]}}_{,\mu} - {{e_\mu}^{b]}}_{,\nu} + e^{\sigma |b]} {e_\mu}^c e_{\nu c, \sigma })$$
where antisymmetrization of indices has an implicit factor of 1/2.

=== By the metric compatibility ===
This formula can be derived in another way. To directly solve the compatibility condition for the spin connection ${\omega_\mu}^{ab}$, one can use the same trick that was used to solve $\nabla_\rho g_{\alpha \beta} = 0$ for the Christoffel symbols ${\Gamma^\gamma}_{\alpha \beta}$. First contract the compatibility condition to give
$${e^\alpha}_b {e^\beta}_c (\partial_{[\alpha} e_{\beta] a} + {\omega_{[\alpha a}}^{d} \;e_{\beta ] d}) = 0.$$

Then, do a cyclic permutation of the free indices $a,b,$ and $c$, and add and subtract the three resulting equations:
$$\Omega_{bca} + \Omega_{abc} - \Omega_{cab} + 2 {e^\alpha}_b \omega_{\alpha ac} = 0$$
where we have used the definition $\Omega_{bca} := {e^\alpha}_b {e^\beta}_c \partial_{[\alpha} e_{\beta ] a}$. The solution for the spin connection is
$$\omega_{\alpha ca} = \frac12 {e_\alpha}^b (\Omega_{bca} + \Omega_{abc} - \Omega_{cab}).$$

From this we obtain the same formula as before.

== Applications ==
The spin connection arises in the Dirac equation when expressed in the language of curved spacetime, see Dirac equation in curved spacetime. Specifically there are problems coupling gravity to spinor fields: there are no finite-dimensional spinor representations of the general covariance group. However, there are of course spinorial representations of the Lorentz group. This fact is utilized by employing tetrad fields describing a flat tangent space at every point of spacetime. The Dirac matrices $\gamma^a$ are contracted onto vierbeins,
$$\gamma^a {e^\mu}_a (x) = \gamma^\mu (x).$$

We wish to construct a generally covariant Dirac equation. Under a flat tangent space Lorentz transformation the spinor transforms as
$$\psi \mapsto e^{i \epsilon^{ab} (x) \sigma_{ab}} \psi$$

We have introduced local Lorentz transformations on flat tangent space generated by the $\sigma_{ab}$'s, such that $\epsilon_{ab}$ is a function of space-time. This means that the partial derivative of a spinor is no longer a genuine tensor. As usual, one introduces a connection field ${\omega_\mu}^{ab}$ that allows us to gauge the Lorentz group. The covariant derivative defined with the spin connection is,
$$\nabla_\mu \psi = \left(\partial_\mu - \tfrac{i}{4} {\omega_\mu}^{ab} \sigma_{ab}\right) \psi= \left(\partial_\mu - \tfrac{i}{4} e_\nu^{\ a} \partial_{;\mu} e^{\nu b} \sigma_{ab}\right) \psi,$$
and is a genuine tensor and Dirac's equation is rewritten as
$$(i \gamma^\mu \nabla_\mu - m) \psi = 0.$$

The generally covariant fermion action couples fermions to gravity when added to the first order tetradic Palatini action,
$$\mathcal{L} = - {1 \over 2 \kappa^2} e\, {e^\mu}_a {e^\nu}_b {\Omega_{\mu \nu}}^{ab} [\omega] + e \overline{\psi} (i \gamma^\mu \nabla_\mu - m) \psi$$
where $e := \det {e_\mu}^a = \sqrt{-g}$ and ${\Omega_{\mu \nu}}^{ab}$ is the curvature of the spin connection.

The tetradic Palatini formulation of general relativity which is a first order formulation of the Einstein–Hilbert action where the tetrad and the spin connection are the basic independent variables. In the 3+1 version of Palatini formulation, the information about the spatial metric, $q_{ab} (x)$, is encoded in the triad $e_a^i$ (three-dimensional, spatial version of the tetrad). Here we extend the metric compatibility condition $D_a q_{bc} = 0$ to $e_a^i$, that is, $D_a e_b^i = 0$ and we obtain a formula similar to the one given above but for the spatial spin connection $\Gamma_a^{ij}$.

The spatial spin connection appears in the definition of Ashtekar–Barbero variables which allows 3+1 general relativity to be rewritten as a special type of $\mathrm{SU}(2)$ Yang–Mills gauge theory. One defines $\Gamma_a^i = \epsilon^{ijk} \Gamma_a^{jk}$. The Ashtekar–Barbero connection variable is then defined as $A_a^i = \Gamma_a^i + \beta c_a^i$ where $c_a^i = c_{ab} e^{bi}$ and $c_{ab}$ is the extrinsic curvature and $\beta$ is the Immirzi parameter. With $A_a^i$ as the configuration variable, the conjugate momentum is the densitized triad $E_a^i = \left|\det (e)\right| e_a^i$. With 3+1 general relativity rewritten as a special type of $\mathrm{SU}(2)$ Yang–Mills gauge theory, it allows the importation of non-perturbative techniques used in Quantum chromodynamics to canonical quantum general relativity.

== See also ==
- Ashtekar variables
- Dirac operator
- Cartan connection
- Levi-Civita connection
- Ricci calculus
- Supergravity
- Torsion tensor
- Contorsion tensor
- Dirac equation in curved spacetime
