= Tetrad formalism =

Approach to general relativity

The tetrad formalism is an approach to general relativity that generalizes the choice of basis for the tangent bundle from a coordinate basis to the less restrictive choice of a local basis, i.e. a locally defined set of four (Note: The same approach can be used for a spacetime of arbitrary dimension, where the frame of the frame bundle is referred to as an n-bein or vielbein.) linearly independent vector fields called a tetrad or vierbein. It is a special case of the more general idea of a vielbein formalism, which is set in (pseudo-)Riemannian geometry. This article as currently written makes frequent mention of general relativity; however, almost everything it says is equally applicable to (pseudo-)Riemannian manifolds in general, and even to spin manifolds. Most statements hold by substituting arbitrary $n$ for $n=4$. In German, "vier" translates to "four", "viel" to "many", and "bein" to "leg".

The general idea is to write the metric tensor as the product of two vielbeins, one on the left, and one on the right. The effect of the vielbeins is to change the coordinate system used on the tangent manifold to one that is simpler or more suitable for calculations. It is frequently the case that the vielbein coordinate system is orthonormal, as that is generally the easiest to use. Most tensors become simple or even trivial in this coordinate system; thus the complexity of most expressions is revealed to be an artifact of the choice of coordinates, rather than a innate property or physical effect. That is, as a formalism, it does not alter predictions; it is rather a calculational technique.

The advantage of the tetrad formalism over the standard coordinate-based approach to general relativity lies in the ability to choose the tetrad basis to reflect important physical aspects of the spacetime. The abstract index notation denotes tensors as if they were represented by their coefficients with respect to a fixed local tetrad. Compared to a completely coordinate free notation, which is often conceptually clearer, it allows an easy and computationally explicit way to denote contractions.

The significance of the tetradic formalism appears in the Einstein–Cartan formulation of general relativity. The tetradic formalism of the theory is more fundamental than its metric formulation as one can not convert between the tetradic and metric formulations of the fermionic actions despite this being possible for bosonic actions. This is effectively because Weyl spinors can be very naturally defined on a Riemannian manifold and their natural setting leads to the spin connection. Those spinors take form in the vielbein coordinate system, and not in the manifold coordinate system.

The privileged tetradic formalism also appears in the dimensional deconstruction of higher dimensional Kaluza–Klein gravity theories and massive gravity theories, in which the extra-dimension(s) is/are replaced by series of N lattice sites such that the higher dimensional metric is replaced by a set of interacting metrics that depend only on the 4D components. Vielbeins commonly appear in other general settings in physics and mathematics. Vielbeins can be understood as solder forms.

== Mathematical formulation ==
The tetrad formulation is a special case of a more general formulation, known as the vielbein or n-bein formulation, with n=4. Vielbein is spelled with an "l", not an "r": in German, "viel" means "many", not to be confused with "vier", meaning "four".

In the vielbein formalism, an open cover of the spacetime manifold $M$ and a local basis for each of those open sets is chosen: a set of $n$ independent vector fields

$$e_a = e_a{}^{\mu} \partial_\mu$$

for $a=1,\ldots,n$ that together span the $n$-dimensional tangent bundle at each point in the set. Dually, a vielbein (or tetrad in 4 dimensions) determines (and is determined by) a dual co-vielbein (co-tetrad) — a set of $n$ independent 1-forms.

$$e^a = e^a{}_{\mu} dx^\mu$$

such that

$$e^a (e_b) = e^a{}_{\mu} e_b{}^\mu = \delta^{a}_{b},$$

where $\delta^{a}_{b}$ is the Kronecker delta. A vielbein is usually specified by its coefficients $e^\mu{}_{a}$ with respect to a coordinate basis, despite the choice of a set of (local) coordinates $x^\mu$ being unnecessary for the specification of a tetrad. Each covector is a solder form.

From the point of view of the differential geometry of fiber bundles, the n vector fields $\{e_a\}_{a=1\dots n}$ define a section of the frame bundle i.e. a parallelization of $U\subset M$ which is equivalent to an isomorphism $TU \cong U\times {\mathbb R^n}$. Since not every manifold is parallelizable, a vielbein can generally only be chosen locally (i.e. only on a coordinate chart $U$ and not all of $M$.)

All tensors of the theory can be expressed in the vector and covector basis, by expressing them as linear combinations of members of the (co)vielbein. For example, the spacetime metric tensor can be transformed from a coordinate basis to the tetrad basis.

Popular tetrad bases in general relativity include orthonormal tetrads and null tetrads. Null tetrads are composed of four null vectors, so are used frequently in problems dealing with radiation, and are the basis of the Newman–Penrose formalism and the GHP formalism.

== Relation to standard formalism ==
The standard formalism of differential geometry (and general relativity) consists of using the coordinate tetrad in the tetrad formalism. The coordinate tetrad is the canonical set of vectors associated with the coordinate chart. The coordinate tetrad is commonly denoted $\{\partial_\mu\}$ whereas the dual cotetrad is denoted $\{d x^\mu\}$. These tangent vectors are usually defined as directional derivative operators: given a chart ${\varphi = (\varphi^1, \ldots, \varphi^n)}$ which maps a subset of the manifold into coordinate space $\mathbb R^n$, and any scalar field $f$, the coordinate vectors are such that:

$$\partial_\mu [f] \equiv \frac{\partial (f \circ \varphi^{-1}) }{\partial x^\mu}.$$

The definition of the cotetrad uses the usual abuse of notation $dx^\mu = d\varphi^\mu$ to define covectors (1-forms) on $M$. The involvement of the coordinate tetrad is not usually made explicit in the standard formalism. In the tetrad formalism, instead of writing tensor equations out fully (including tetrad elements and tensor products $\otimes$ as above) only components of the tensors are mentioned. For example, the metric is written as "$g_{ab}$". When the tetrad is unspecified this becomes a matter of specifying the type of the tensor called abstract index notation. It allows to easily specify contraction between tensors by repeating indices as in the Einstein summation convention.

Changing tetrads is a routine operation in the standard formalism, as it is involved in every coordinate transformation (i.e., changing from one coordinate tetrad basis to another). Switching between multiple coordinate charts is necessary because, except in trivial cases, it is not possible for a single coordinate chart to cover the entire manifold. Changing to and between general tetrads is much similar and equally necessary (except for parallelizable manifolds). Any tensor can locally be written in terms of this coordinate tetrad or a general (co)tetrad.

For example, the metric tensor $\mathbf g$ can be expressed as:

$$\mathbf g = g_{\mu\nu}dx^\mu dx^\nu \qquad \text{where}~g_{\mu\nu} = \mathbf g(\partial_\mu,\partial_\nu) .$$

(Here we use the Einstein summation convention). Likewise, the metric can be expressed with respect to an arbitrary (co)tetrad as

$$\mathbf g = g_{ab}e^a e^b \qquad \text{where}~g_{ab} = \mathbf g\left(e_a,e_b\right) .$$

Here, we use choice of alphabet (Latin and Greek) for the index variables to distinguish the applicable basis.

We can translate from a general co-tetrad to the coordinate co-tetrad by expanding the covector $e^a = e^a{}_{\mu} dx^\mu$. We then get

$$\mathbf g = g_{ab}e^a e^b =
g_{ab}e^a{}_{\mu} e^b{}_{\nu} dx^\mu dx^\nu = g_{\mu\nu}dx^{\mu}dx^{\nu}$$

from which it follows that $g_{\mu\nu} = g_{ab}e^a{}_{\mu} e^b{}_{\nu}$. Likewise expanding $dx^\mu = e^\mu{}_{a}e^a$ with respect to the general tetrad, we get

$$\mathbf g =  g_{\mu\nu}dx^{\mu}dx^{\nu} =
g_{\mu \nu} e^\mu{}_{a} e^\nu{}_{b} e^a e^b = g_{ab}e^a e^b$$

which shows that $g_{ab} = g_{\mu\nu}e^\mu{}_{a} e^\nu{}_{b}$.

=== Manipulation of indices ===
The manipulation with tetrad coefficients shows that abstract index formulas can, in principle, be obtained from tensor formulas with respect to a coordinate tetrad by "replacing greek by latin indices". However care must be taken that a coordinate tetrad formula defines a genuine tensor when differentiation is involved. Since the coordinate vector fields have vanishing Lie bracket (i.e. commute: $\partial_\mu\partial_\nu = \partial_\nu\partial_\mu$), naive substitutions of formulas that correctly compute tensor coefficients with respect to a coordinate tetrad may not correctly define a tensor with respect to a general tetrad because the Lie bracket is non-vanishing: $[e_a, e_b] \ne 0$. Thus, it is sometimes said that tetrad coordinates provide a non-holonomic basis.

For example, the Riemann curvature tensor is defined for general vector fields $X, Y$ by

$$R(X,Y) = \left(\nabla_X \nabla_Y - \nabla_Y\nabla_X - \nabla_{[X,Y]}\right)$$.

In a coordinate tetrad this gives tensor coefficients

$$R^\mu_{\ \nu\sigma\tau} =
dx^\mu\left((\nabla_\sigma\nabla_\tau - \nabla_\tau\nabla_\sigma)\partial_\nu\right).$$

The naive "Greek to Latin" substitution of the latter expression

$$R^a_{\ bcd} = e^a\left((\nabla_c\nabla_d - \nabla_d\nabla_c)e_b\right) \qquad \text{(wrong!)}$$

is incorrect because for fixed c and d, $\left(\nabla_c\nabla_d - \nabla_d\nabla_c\right)$ is, in general, a first order differential operator rather than a zeroth order operator which defines a tensor coefficient. Substituting a general tetrad basis in the abstract formula we find the proper definition of the curvature in abstract index notation, however:

$$R^a_{\ bcd}= e^a\left((\nabla_c\nabla_d - \nabla_d\nabla_c - f_{cd}{}^{e}\nabla_e)e_b\right)$$

where $[e_a, e_b] = f_{ab}{}^{c}e_c$. Note that the expression $\left(\nabla_c\nabla_d - \nabla_d\nabla_c - f_{cd}{}^{e}\nabla_e\right)$ is indeed a zeroth order operator, hence (the (c d)-component of) a tensor. Since it agrees with the coordinate expression for the curvature when specialised to a coordinate tetrad it is clear, even without using the abstract definition of the curvature, that it defines the same tensor as the coordinate basis expression.

== Example: Lie groups ==
Given a vector (or covector) in the tangent (or cotangent) manifold, the exponential map describes the corresponding geodesic of that tangent vector. Writing $X\in TM$, the parallel transport of a differential corresponds to

$$e^{-X} de^X= dX-\frac{1}{2!}\left[X,dX\right]+\frac{1}{3!}[X,[X,dX]]-\frac{1}{4!}[X,[X,[X,dX]]]+\cdots$$

The above can be readily verified simply by taking $X$ to be a matrix.

For the special case of a Lie algebra, the $X$ can be taken to be an element of the algebra, the exponential is the exponential map of a Lie group, and group elements correspond to the geodesics of the tangent vector. Choosing a basis $e_i$ for the Lie algebra and writing $X=X^ie_i$ for some functions $X^i,$ the commutators can be explicitly written out. One readily computes that

$$e^{-X}d e^X=
dX^i e_i-\frac{1}{2!} X^i dX^j {f_{ij}}^k e_k +
\frac{1}{3!} X^iX^j dX^k {f_{jk}}^l {f_{il}}^m e_m - \cdots$$

for $[e_i,e_j]={f_{ij}}^k e_k$ the structure constants of the Lie algebra. The series can be written more compactly as

$$e^{-X}d e^X= e_i{W^i}_j dX^j$$

with the infinite series

$$W=\sum_{n=0}^\infty \frac{(-1)^nM^n}{(n+1)!} = (I-e^{-M})M^{-1}.$$

Here, $M$ is a matrix whose matrix elements are ${M_j}^k = X^i{f_{ij}}^k$. The matrix $W$ is then the vielbein; it expresses the differential $dX^j$ in terms of the "flat coordinates" (orthonormal, at that) $e_i$.

Given some map $N\to G$ from some manifold $N$ to some Lie group $G$, the metric tensor on the manifold $N$ becomes the pullback of the metric tensor $B_{mn}$ on the Lie group $G$:

$$g_{ij}= {W_i}^m B_{mn}{W^n}_j$$

The metric tensor $B_{mn}$ on the Lie group is the Cartan metric, aka the Killing form. Note that, as a matrix, the second W is the transpose. For $N$ a (pseudo-)Riemannian manifold, the metric is a (pseudo-)Riemannian metric. The above generalizes to the case of symmetric spaces. These vielbeins are used to perform calculations in sigma models, of which the supergravity theories are a special case.

== See also ==
- Frame bundle
- Orthonormal frame bundle
- Principal bundle
- Spin bundle
- Connection (mathematics)
- G-structure
- Spin manifold
- Spin structure
- Tetradic Palatini action
- Dirac equation in curved spacetime
